

216001–216100 

|-bgcolor=#d6d6d6
| 216001 ||  || — || September 26, 2005 || Apache Point || A. C. Becker || — || align=right | 3.3 km || 
|-id=002 bgcolor=#d6d6d6
| 216002 ||  || — || October 1, 2005 || Catalina || CSS || Tj (2.99) || align=right | 7.2 km || 
|-id=003 bgcolor=#d6d6d6
| 216003 ||  || — || October 5, 2005 || Catalina || CSS || — || align=right | 4.2 km || 
|-id=004 bgcolor=#d6d6d6
| 216004 ||  || — || October 8, 2005 || Bergisch Gladbach || W. Bickel || — || align=right | 2.9 km || 
|-id=005 bgcolor=#d6d6d6
| 216005 ||  || — || October 7, 2005 || Kitt Peak || Spacewatch || 7:4 || align=right | 4.6 km || 
|-id=006 bgcolor=#d6d6d6
| 216006 ||  || — || October 9, 2005 || Kitt Peak || Spacewatch || — || align=right | 3.4 km || 
|-id=007 bgcolor=#E9E9E9
| 216007 ||  || — || October 9, 2005 || Kitt Peak || Spacewatch || — || align=right | 3.2 km || 
|-id=008 bgcolor=#d6d6d6
| 216008 ||  || — || October 1, 2005 || Anderson Mesa || LONEOS || HYG || align=right | 4.6 km || 
|-id=009 bgcolor=#d6d6d6
| 216009 ||  || — || October 24, 2005 || Kitt Peak || Spacewatch || THM || align=right | 2.7 km || 
|-id=010 bgcolor=#d6d6d6
| 216010 ||  || — || October 22, 2005 || Palomar || NEAT || — || align=right | 2.9 km || 
|-id=011 bgcolor=#d6d6d6
| 216011 ||  || — || October 22, 2005 || Palomar || NEAT || — || align=right | 4.9 km || 
|-id=012 bgcolor=#d6d6d6
| 216012 ||  || — || October 25, 2005 || Catalina || CSS || EUP || align=right | 7.5 km || 
|-id=013 bgcolor=#d6d6d6
| 216013 ||  || — || October 22, 2005 || Kitt Peak || Spacewatch || KOR || align=right | 2.6 km || 
|-id=014 bgcolor=#d6d6d6
| 216014 ||  || — || October 25, 2005 || Catalina || CSS || — || align=right | 6.0 km || 
|-id=015 bgcolor=#E9E9E9
| 216015 ||  || — || October 27, 2005 || Socorro || LINEAR || — || align=right | 2.1 km || 
|-id=016 bgcolor=#fefefe
| 216016 ||  || — || October 27, 2005 || Mount Lemmon || Mount Lemmon Survey || V || align=right | 1.0 km || 
|-id=017 bgcolor=#d6d6d6
| 216017 ||  || — || October 28, 2005 || Kitt Peak || Spacewatch || — || align=right | 4.8 km || 
|-id=018 bgcolor=#E9E9E9
| 216018 ||  || — || October 25, 2005 || Catalina || CSS || — || align=right | 3.5 km || 
|-id=019 bgcolor=#d6d6d6
| 216019 ||  || — || October 27, 2005 || Catalina || CSS || — || align=right | 4.4 km || 
|-id=020 bgcolor=#fefefe
| 216020 ||  || — || October 24, 2005 || Kitt Peak || Spacewatch || — || align=right | 1.8 km || 
|-id=021 bgcolor=#d6d6d6
| 216021 ||  || — || October 24, 2005 || Kitt Peak || Spacewatch || TIR || align=right | 4.4 km || 
|-id=022 bgcolor=#d6d6d6
| 216022 ||  || — || October 25, 2005 || Apache Point || A. C. Becker || — || align=right | 4.2 km || 
|-id=023 bgcolor=#d6d6d6
| 216023 ||  || — || November 2, 2005 || Desert Moon || B. L. Stevens || — || align=right | 3.8 km || 
|-id=024 bgcolor=#E9E9E9
| 216024 ||  || — || November 2, 2005 || Mount Lemmon || Mount Lemmon Survey || — || align=right | 4.1 km || 
|-id=025 bgcolor=#d6d6d6
| 216025 ||  || — || November 4, 2005 || Mount Lemmon || Mount Lemmon Survey || NAE || align=right | 4.0 km || 
|-id=026 bgcolor=#d6d6d6
| 216026 ||  || — || November 6, 2005 || Kitt Peak || Spacewatch || — || align=right | 3.2 km || 
|-id=027 bgcolor=#d6d6d6
| 216027 ||  || — || November 11, 2005 || Kitt Peak || Spacewatch || — || align=right | 2.7 km || 
|-id=028 bgcolor=#d6d6d6
| 216028 ||  || — || November 28, 2005 || Junk Bond || D. Healy || — || align=right | 3.3 km || 
|-id=029 bgcolor=#E9E9E9
| 216029 ||  || — || December 7, 2005 || Socorro || LINEAR || — || align=right | 2.3 km || 
|-id=030 bgcolor=#d6d6d6
| 216030 ||  || — || December 4, 2005 || Kitt Peak || Spacewatch || — || align=right | 5.3 km || 
|-id=031 bgcolor=#fefefe
| 216031 ||  || — || December 28, 2005 || Mount Lemmon || Mount Lemmon Survey || — || align=right data-sort-value="0.96" | 960 m || 
|-id=032 bgcolor=#fefefe
| 216032 ||  || — || December 31, 2005 || Kitt Peak || Spacewatch || V || align=right | 1.1 km || 
|-id=033 bgcolor=#fefefe
| 216033 ||  || — || January 4, 2006 || Mount Lemmon || Mount Lemmon Survey || NYS || align=right | 1.1 km || 
|-id=034 bgcolor=#C2FFFF
| 216034 ||  || — || January 28, 2006 || Mount Lemmon || Mount Lemmon Survey || L5 || align=right | 15 km || 
|-id=035 bgcolor=#fefefe
| 216035 ||  || — || January 26, 2006 || Mount Lemmon || Mount Lemmon Survey || — || align=right data-sort-value="0.92" | 920 m || 
|-id=036 bgcolor=#fefefe
| 216036 ||  || — || February 21, 2006 || Catalina || CSS || fast? || align=right | 1.4 km || 
|-id=037 bgcolor=#d6d6d6
| 216037 ||  || — || February 21, 2006 || Mount Lemmon || Mount Lemmon Survey || — || align=right | 4.5 km || 
|-id=038 bgcolor=#fefefe
| 216038 ||  || — || February 24, 2006 || Mount Lemmon || Mount Lemmon Survey || — || align=right data-sort-value="0.79" | 790 m || 
|-id=039 bgcolor=#E9E9E9
| 216039 ||  || — || March 2, 2006 || Kitt Peak || Spacewatch || — || align=right | 2.9 km || 
|-id=040 bgcolor=#d6d6d6
| 216040 ||  || — || April 18, 2006 || Anderson Mesa || LONEOS || — || align=right | 3.1 km || 
|-id=041 bgcolor=#fefefe
| 216041 ||  || — || April 19, 2006 || Kitt Peak || Spacewatch || — || align=right | 1.0 km || 
|-id=042 bgcolor=#fefefe
| 216042 ||  || — || May 2, 2006 || Mount Lemmon || Mount Lemmon Survey || FLO || align=right data-sort-value="0.71" | 710 m || 
|-id=043 bgcolor=#d6d6d6
| 216043 ||  || — || May 4, 2006 || Mount Lemmon || Mount Lemmon Survey || THM || align=right | 2.9 km || 
|-id=044 bgcolor=#fefefe
| 216044 ||  || — || May 4, 2006 || Kitt Peak || Spacewatch || — || align=right data-sort-value="0.75" | 750 m || 
|-id=045 bgcolor=#fefefe
| 216045 ||  || — || May 21, 2006 || Kitt Peak || Spacewatch || — || align=right data-sort-value="0.92" | 920 m || 
|-id=046 bgcolor=#fefefe
| 216046 ||  || — || June 3, 2006 || Mount Lemmon || Mount Lemmon Survey || — || align=right data-sort-value="0.83" | 830 m || 
|-id=047 bgcolor=#fefefe
| 216047 ||  || — || July 18, 2006 || Mount Lemmon || Mount Lemmon Survey || — || align=right | 1.3 km || 
|-id=048 bgcolor=#fefefe
| 216048 ||  || — || July 26, 2006 || Cordell-Lorenz || Cordell–Lorenz Obs. || — || align=right data-sort-value="0.95" | 950 m || 
|-id=049 bgcolor=#fefefe
| 216049 ||  || — || July 25, 2006 || Palomar || NEAT || — || align=right data-sort-value="0.90" | 900 m || 
|-id=050 bgcolor=#fefefe
| 216050 ||  || — || July 26, 2006 || Reedy Creek || J. Broughton || — || align=right | 1.1 km || 
|-id=051 bgcolor=#E9E9E9
| 216051 ||  || — || July 18, 2006 || Siding Spring || SSS || — || align=right | 2.5 km || 
|-id=052 bgcolor=#fefefe
| 216052 ||  || — || July 31, 2006 || Siding Spring || SSS || — || align=right | 1.1 km || 
|-id=053 bgcolor=#fefefe
| 216053 ||  || — || August 13, 2006 || Palomar || NEAT || — || align=right | 1.3 km || 
|-id=054 bgcolor=#fefefe
| 216054 ||  || — || August 14, 2006 || Siding Spring || SSS || FLO || align=right data-sort-value="0.98" | 980 m || 
|-id=055 bgcolor=#fefefe
| 216055 ||  || — || August 14, 2006 || Siding Spring || SSS || V || align=right data-sort-value="0.92" | 920 m || 
|-id=056 bgcolor=#fefefe
| 216056 ||  || — || August 15, 2006 || Palomar || NEAT || — || align=right data-sort-value="0.96" | 960 m || 
|-id=057 bgcolor=#fefefe
| 216057 ||  || — || August 15, 2006 || Palomar || NEAT || NYS || align=right data-sort-value="0.82" | 820 m || 
|-id=058 bgcolor=#fefefe
| 216058 ||  || — || August 12, 2006 || Palomar || NEAT || — || align=right | 1.1 km || 
|-id=059 bgcolor=#fefefe
| 216059 ||  || — || August 14, 2006 || Palomar || NEAT || V || align=right | 1.1 km || 
|-id=060 bgcolor=#fefefe
| 216060 ||  || — || August 17, 2006 || Palomar || NEAT || — || align=right | 1.3 km || 
|-id=061 bgcolor=#E9E9E9
| 216061 ||  || — || August 17, 2006 || Palomar || NEAT || — || align=right | 3.6 km || 
|-id=062 bgcolor=#fefefe
| 216062 ||  || — || August 18, 2006 || Socorro || LINEAR || PHO || align=right | 1.2 km || 
|-id=063 bgcolor=#fefefe
| 216063 ||  || — || August 19, 2006 || Kitt Peak || Spacewatch || MAS || align=right data-sort-value="0.92" | 920 m || 
|-id=064 bgcolor=#fefefe
| 216064 ||  || — || August 20, 2006 || Kanab || E. E. Sheridan || V || align=right data-sort-value="0.88" | 880 m || 
|-id=065 bgcolor=#fefefe
| 216065 ||  || — || August 16, 2006 || Lulin Observatory || C.-S. Lin, Q.-z. Ye || — || align=right | 1.1 km || 
|-id=066 bgcolor=#fefefe
| 216066 ||  || — || August 16, 2006 || Siding Spring || SSS || V || align=right | 1.0 km || 
|-id=067 bgcolor=#fefefe
| 216067 ||  || — || August 16, 2006 || Siding Spring || SSS || V || align=right data-sort-value="0.89" | 890 m || 
|-id=068 bgcolor=#fefefe
| 216068 ||  || — || August 17, 2006 || Palomar || NEAT || — || align=right | 1.3 km || 
|-id=069 bgcolor=#d6d6d6
| 216069 ||  || — || August 17, 2006 || Palomar || NEAT || 7:4 || align=right | 4.1 km || 
|-id=070 bgcolor=#fefefe
| 216070 ||  || — || August 18, 2006 || Anderson Mesa || LONEOS || — || align=right data-sort-value="0.83" | 830 m || 
|-id=071 bgcolor=#fefefe
| 216071 ||  || — || August 18, 2006 || Anderson Mesa || LONEOS || NYS || align=right data-sort-value="0.84" | 840 m || 
|-id=072 bgcolor=#fefefe
| 216072 ||  || — || August 16, 2006 || Siding Spring || SSS || NYS || align=right | 1.5 km || 
|-id=073 bgcolor=#fefefe
| 216073 ||  || — || August 23, 2006 || Socorro || LINEAR || — || align=right | 1.6 km || 
|-id=074 bgcolor=#fefefe
| 216074 ||  || — || August 21, 2006 || Pla D'Arguines || R. Ferrando || — || align=right | 1.2 km || 
|-id=075 bgcolor=#fefefe
| 216075 ||  || — || August 19, 2006 || Anderson Mesa || LONEOS || — || align=right | 1.1 km || 
|-id=076 bgcolor=#E9E9E9
| 216076 ||  || — || August 20, 2006 || Palomar || NEAT || — || align=right | 1.3 km || 
|-id=077 bgcolor=#fefefe
| 216077 ||  || — || August 23, 2006 || Palomar || NEAT || — || align=right | 1.1 km || 
|-id=078 bgcolor=#fefefe
| 216078 ||  || — || August 16, 2006 || Siding Spring || SSS || FLO || align=right data-sort-value="0.94" | 940 m || 
|-id=079 bgcolor=#E9E9E9
| 216079 ||  || — || August 27, 2006 || Kanab || E. E. Sheridan || — || align=right | 3.1 km || 
|-id=080 bgcolor=#fefefe
| 216080 ||  || — || August 20, 2006 || Palomar || NEAT || — || align=right | 1.1 km || 
|-id=081 bgcolor=#fefefe
| 216081 ||  || — || August 22, 2006 || Palomar || NEAT || — || align=right data-sort-value="0.87" | 870 m || 
|-id=082 bgcolor=#fefefe
| 216082 ||  || — || August 23, 2006 || Socorro || LINEAR || NYS || align=right | 1.0 km || 
|-id=083 bgcolor=#d6d6d6
| 216083 ||  || — || August 27, 2006 || Kitt Peak || Spacewatch || — || align=right | 4.3 km || 
|-id=084 bgcolor=#d6d6d6
| 216084 ||  || — || August 16, 2006 || Palomar || NEAT || — || align=right | 4.4 km || 
|-id=085 bgcolor=#fefefe
| 216085 ||  || — || August 28, 2006 || Catalina || CSS || — || align=right | 1.4 km || 
|-id=086 bgcolor=#fefefe
| 216086 ||  || — || August 20, 2006 || Palomar || NEAT || V || align=right data-sort-value="0.88" | 880 m || 
|-id=087 bgcolor=#fefefe
| 216087 ||  || — || August 27, 2006 || Anderson Mesa || LONEOS || — || align=right data-sort-value="0.83" | 830 m || 
|-id=088 bgcolor=#fefefe
| 216088 ||  || — || August 27, 2006 || Anderson Mesa || LONEOS || — || align=right | 1.1 km || 
|-id=089 bgcolor=#fefefe
| 216089 ||  || — || August 29, 2006 || Anderson Mesa || LONEOS || — || align=right | 1.8 km || 
|-id=090 bgcolor=#fefefe
| 216090 ||  || — || August 29, 2006 || Anderson Mesa || LONEOS || — || align=right | 2.4 km || 
|-id=091 bgcolor=#E9E9E9
| 216091 ||  || — || August 19, 2006 || Kitt Peak || Spacewatch || — || align=right | 1.2 km || 
|-id=092 bgcolor=#fefefe
| 216092 ||  || — || August 19, 2006 || Kitt Peak || Spacewatch || MAS || align=right data-sort-value="0.86" | 860 m || 
|-id=093 bgcolor=#E9E9E9
| 216093 ||  || — || August 30, 2006 || Socorro || LINEAR || — || align=right | 1.3 km || 
|-id=094 bgcolor=#fefefe
| 216094 ||  || — || August 30, 2006 || Anderson Mesa || LONEOS || — || align=right | 1.4 km || 
|-id=095 bgcolor=#E9E9E9
| 216095 ||  || — || September 14, 2006 || Kitt Peak || Spacewatch || — || align=right | 3.0 km || 
|-id=096 bgcolor=#E9E9E9
| 216096 ||  || — || September 14, 2006 || Kitt Peak || Spacewatch || JUN || align=right | 1.4 km || 
|-id=097 bgcolor=#E9E9E9
| 216097 ||  || — || September 14, 2006 || Catalina || CSS || — || align=right | 2.1 km || 
|-id=098 bgcolor=#E9E9E9
| 216098 ||  || — || September 14, 2006 || Palomar || NEAT || JUN || align=right | 3.0 km || 
|-id=099 bgcolor=#fefefe
| 216099 ||  || — || September 15, 2006 || Kitt Peak || Spacewatch || — || align=right data-sort-value="0.84" | 840 m || 
|-id=100 bgcolor=#fefefe
| 216100 ||  || — || September 12, 2006 || Socorro || LINEAR || — || align=right | 1.2 km || 
|}

216101–216200 

|-bgcolor=#fefefe
| 216101 ||  || — || September 12, 2006 || Catalina || CSS || FLO || align=right | 1.1 km || 
|-id=102 bgcolor=#fefefe
| 216102 ||  || — || September 14, 2006 || Kitt Peak || Spacewatch || — || align=right data-sort-value="0.85" | 850 m || 
|-id=103 bgcolor=#fefefe
| 216103 ||  || — || September 12, 2006 || Catalina || CSS || NYS || align=right | 1.2 km || 
|-id=104 bgcolor=#fefefe
| 216104 ||  || — || September 14, 2006 || Kitt Peak || Spacewatch || ERI || align=right | 1.4 km || 
|-id=105 bgcolor=#d6d6d6
| 216105 ||  || — || September 14, 2006 || Kitt Peak || Spacewatch || HYG || align=right | 4.0 km || 
|-id=106 bgcolor=#E9E9E9
| 216106 ||  || — || September 14, 2006 || Kitt Peak || Spacewatch || — || align=right | 2.5 km || 
|-id=107 bgcolor=#E9E9E9
| 216107 ||  || — || September 14, 2006 || Catalina || CSS || — || align=right | 2.5 km || 
|-id=108 bgcolor=#fefefe
| 216108 ||  || — || September 15, 2006 || Kitt Peak || Spacewatch || — || align=right data-sort-value="0.72" | 720 m || 
|-id=109 bgcolor=#fefefe
| 216109 ||  || — || September 15, 2006 || Kitt Peak || Spacewatch || NYS || align=right data-sort-value="0.85" | 850 m || 
|-id=110 bgcolor=#fefefe
| 216110 ||  || — || September 15, 2006 || Kitt Peak || Spacewatch || NYS || align=right data-sort-value="0.95" | 950 m || 
|-id=111 bgcolor=#E9E9E9
| 216111 ||  || — || September 15, 2006 || Kitt Peak || Spacewatch || — || align=right | 1.9 km || 
|-id=112 bgcolor=#E9E9E9
| 216112 ||  || — || September 15, 2006 || Kitt Peak || Spacewatch || HOF || align=right | 3.3 km || 
|-id=113 bgcolor=#E9E9E9
| 216113 ||  || — || September 15, 2006 || Kitt Peak || Spacewatch || — || align=right | 2.3 km || 
|-id=114 bgcolor=#fefefe
| 216114 ||  || — || September 17, 2006 || Catalina || CSS || — || align=right data-sort-value="0.94" | 940 m || 
|-id=115 bgcolor=#FFC2E0
| 216115 ||  || — || September 18, 2006 || Kitt Peak || Spacewatch || APOPHA || align=right data-sort-value="0.59" | 590 m || 
|-id=116 bgcolor=#fefefe
| 216116 ||  || — || September 17, 2006 || Kitt Peak || Spacewatch || — || align=right | 3.2 km || 
|-id=117 bgcolor=#fefefe
| 216117 ||  || — || September 17, 2006 || Anderson Mesa || LONEOS || V || align=right data-sort-value="0.88" | 880 m || 
|-id=118 bgcolor=#E9E9E9
| 216118 ||  || — || September 18, 2006 || Kitt Peak || Spacewatch || — || align=right | 2.9 km || 
|-id=119 bgcolor=#E9E9E9
| 216119 ||  || — || September 18, 2006 || Anderson Mesa || LONEOS || — || align=right | 2.2 km || 
|-id=120 bgcolor=#fefefe
| 216120 ||  || — || September 19, 2006 || Catalina || CSS || — || align=right data-sort-value="0.80" | 800 m || 
|-id=121 bgcolor=#fefefe
| 216121 ||  || — || September 20, 2006 || Catalina || CSS || — || align=right | 1.3 km || 
|-id=122 bgcolor=#fefefe
| 216122 ||  || — || September 18, 2006 || Anderson Mesa || LONEOS || V || align=right data-sort-value="0.84" | 840 m || 
|-id=123 bgcolor=#E9E9E9
| 216123 ||  || — || September 19, 2006 || Kitt Peak || Spacewatch || AST || align=right | 3.9 km || 
|-id=124 bgcolor=#E9E9E9
| 216124 ||  || — || September 19, 2006 || Kitt Peak || Spacewatch || — || align=right | 2.2 km || 
|-id=125 bgcolor=#fefefe
| 216125 ||  || — || September 19, 2006 || Kitt Peak || Spacewatch || — || align=right data-sort-value="0.83" | 830 m || 
|-id=126 bgcolor=#d6d6d6
| 216126 ||  || — || September 18, 2006 || Kitt Peak || Spacewatch || THM || align=right | 2.9 km || 
|-id=127 bgcolor=#E9E9E9
| 216127 ||  || — || September 18, 2006 || Kitt Peak || Spacewatch || HEN || align=right | 1.5 km || 
|-id=128 bgcolor=#fefefe
| 216128 ||  || — || September 18, 2006 || Kitt Peak || Spacewatch || MAS || align=right | 1.1 km || 
|-id=129 bgcolor=#fefefe
| 216129 ||  || — || September 18, 2006 || Kitt Peak || Spacewatch || MAS || align=right data-sort-value="0.96" | 960 m || 
|-id=130 bgcolor=#d6d6d6
| 216130 ||  || — || September 18, 2006 || Kitt Peak || Spacewatch || KAR || align=right | 1.6 km || 
|-id=131 bgcolor=#E9E9E9
| 216131 ||  || — || September 18, 2006 || Kitt Peak || Spacewatch || — || align=right | 2.4 km || 
|-id=132 bgcolor=#E9E9E9
| 216132 ||  || — || September 19, 2006 || Kitt Peak || Spacewatch || — || align=right | 2.0 km || 
|-id=133 bgcolor=#E9E9E9
| 216133 ||  || — || September 19, 2006 || Kitt Peak || Spacewatch || — || align=right | 1.9 km || 
|-id=134 bgcolor=#fefefe
| 216134 ||  || — || September 19, 2006 || Catalina || CSS || — || align=right | 1.5 km || 
|-id=135 bgcolor=#E9E9E9
| 216135 ||  || — || September 19, 2006 || Kitt Peak || Spacewatch || — || align=right | 1.4 km || 
|-id=136 bgcolor=#E9E9E9
| 216136 ||  || — || September 19, 2006 || Kitt Peak || Spacewatch || — || align=right | 2.7 km || 
|-id=137 bgcolor=#d6d6d6
| 216137 ||  || — || September 20, 2006 || Catalina || CSS || BRA || align=right | 2.4 km || 
|-id=138 bgcolor=#fefefe
| 216138 ||  || — || September 23, 2006 || Kitt Peak || Spacewatch || — || align=right data-sort-value="0.98" | 980 m || 
|-id=139 bgcolor=#fefefe
| 216139 ||  || — || September 18, 2006 || Catalina || CSS || — || align=right | 1.0 km || 
|-id=140 bgcolor=#fefefe
| 216140 ||  || — || September 18, 2006 || Catalina || CSS || — || align=right | 2.0 km || 
|-id=141 bgcolor=#fefefe
| 216141 ||  || — || September 19, 2006 || Catalina || CSS || MAS || align=right data-sort-value="0.81" | 810 m || 
|-id=142 bgcolor=#fefefe
| 216142 ||  || — || September 19, 2006 || Kitt Peak || Spacewatch || — || align=right data-sort-value="0.89" | 890 m || 
|-id=143 bgcolor=#E9E9E9
| 216143 ||  || — || September 25, 2006 || Kitt Peak || Spacewatch || — || align=right | 2.0 km || 
|-id=144 bgcolor=#E9E9E9
| 216144 ||  || — || September 30, 2006 || Catalina || CSS || — || align=right | 2.9 km || 
|-id=145 bgcolor=#d6d6d6
| 216145 ||  || — || September 26, 2006 || Mount Lemmon || Mount Lemmon Survey || KOR || align=right | 1.5 km || 
|-id=146 bgcolor=#E9E9E9
| 216146 ||  || — || September 26, 2006 || Mount Lemmon || Mount Lemmon Survey || HEN || align=right | 1.2 km || 
|-id=147 bgcolor=#E9E9E9
| 216147 ||  || — || September 27, 2006 || Kitt Peak || Spacewatch || HEN || align=right | 3.5 km || 
|-id=148 bgcolor=#fefefe
| 216148 ||  || — || September 29, 2006 || Anderson Mesa || LONEOS || V || align=right | 1.0 km || 
|-id=149 bgcolor=#E9E9E9
| 216149 ||  || — || September 29, 2006 || Anderson Mesa || LONEOS || — || align=right | 2.3 km || 
|-id=150 bgcolor=#E9E9E9
| 216150 ||  || — || September 24, 2006 || Kitt Peak || Spacewatch || — || align=right | 4.0 km || 
|-id=151 bgcolor=#E9E9E9
| 216151 ||  || — || September 26, 2006 || Catalina || CSS || — || align=right | 1.6 km || 
|-id=152 bgcolor=#E9E9E9
| 216152 ||  || — || September 25, 2006 || Kitt Peak || Spacewatch || — || align=right | 3.7 km || 
|-id=153 bgcolor=#d6d6d6
| 216153 ||  || — || September 26, 2006 || Catalina || CSS || — || align=right | 4.4 km || 
|-id=154 bgcolor=#E9E9E9
| 216154 ||  || — || September 27, 2006 || Kitt Peak || Spacewatch || MAR || align=right | 1.6 km || 
|-id=155 bgcolor=#E9E9E9
| 216155 ||  || — || September 27, 2006 || Kitt Peak || Spacewatch || AGN || align=right | 1.5 km || 
|-id=156 bgcolor=#fefefe
| 216156 ||  || — || September 27, 2006 || Kitt Peak || Spacewatch || — || align=right data-sort-value="0.67" | 670 m || 
|-id=157 bgcolor=#d6d6d6
| 216157 ||  || — || September 27, 2006 || Kitt Peak || Spacewatch || KOR || align=right | 1.4 km || 
|-id=158 bgcolor=#fefefe
| 216158 ||  || — || September 27, 2006 || Kitt Peak || Spacewatch || NYS || align=right data-sort-value="0.93" | 930 m || 
|-id=159 bgcolor=#E9E9E9
| 216159 ||  || — || September 28, 2006 || Kitt Peak || Spacewatch || — || align=right | 1.6 km || 
|-id=160 bgcolor=#E9E9E9
| 216160 ||  || — || September 28, 2006 || Kitt Peak || Spacewatch || — || align=right | 3.2 km || 
|-id=161 bgcolor=#fefefe
| 216161 ||  || — || September 30, 2006 || Catalina || CSS || — || align=right | 1.1 km || 
|-id=162 bgcolor=#E9E9E9
| 216162 ||  || — || September 30, 2006 || Mount Lemmon || Mount Lemmon Survey || — || align=right | 2.8 km || 
|-id=163 bgcolor=#d6d6d6
| 216163 ||  || — || September 30, 2006 || Mount Lemmon || Mount Lemmon Survey || EOS || align=right | 2.4 km || 
|-id=164 bgcolor=#fefefe
| 216164 ||  || — || September 17, 2006 || Apache Point || A. C. Becker || — || align=right | 1.1 km || 
|-id=165 bgcolor=#E9E9E9
| 216165 ||  || — || September 29, 2006 || Apache Point || A. C. Becker || AEO || align=right | 1.3 km || 
|-id=166 bgcolor=#E9E9E9
| 216166 ||  || — || September 29, 2006 || Apache Point || A. C. Becker || — || align=right | 3.8 km || 
|-id=167 bgcolor=#d6d6d6
| 216167 ||  || — || September 30, 2006 || Apache Point || A. C. Becker || — || align=right | 3.1 km || 
|-id=168 bgcolor=#E9E9E9
| 216168 ||  || — || September 18, 2006 || Kitt Peak || Spacewatch || — || align=right | 1.6 km || 
|-id=169 bgcolor=#E9E9E9
| 216169 ||  || — || September 26, 2006 || Mount Lemmon || Mount Lemmon Survey || — || align=right | 1.4 km || 
|-id=170 bgcolor=#d6d6d6
| 216170 ||  || — || September 30, 2006 || Mount Lemmon || Mount Lemmon Survey || — || align=right | 3.9 km || 
|-id=171 bgcolor=#E9E9E9
| 216171 ||  || — || September 30, 2006 || Mount Lemmon || Mount Lemmon Survey || — || align=right | 1.7 km || 
|-id=172 bgcolor=#d6d6d6
| 216172 ||  || — || September 19, 2006 || Catalina || CSS || BRA || align=right | 2.2 km || 
|-id=173 bgcolor=#E9E9E9
| 216173 ||  || — || October 3, 2006 || Mount Lemmon || Mount Lemmon Survey || — || align=right | 2.3 km || 
|-id=174 bgcolor=#d6d6d6
| 216174 ||  || — || October 11, 2006 || Kitt Peak || Spacewatch || — || align=right | 5.7 km || 
|-id=175 bgcolor=#E9E9E9
| 216175 ||  || — || October 11, 2006 || Kitt Peak || Spacewatch || ADE || align=right | 4.0 km || 
|-id=176 bgcolor=#E9E9E9
| 216176 ||  || — || October 11, 2006 || Kitt Peak || Spacewatch || PAD || align=right | 2.4 km || 
|-id=177 bgcolor=#E9E9E9
| 216177 ||  || — || October 11, 2006 || Kitt Peak || Spacewatch || HEN || align=right | 1.3 km || 
|-id=178 bgcolor=#E9E9E9
| 216178 ||  || — || October 11, 2006 || Kitt Peak || Spacewatch || RAF || align=right | 1.7 km || 
|-id=179 bgcolor=#E9E9E9
| 216179 ||  || — || October 11, 2006 || Kitt Peak || Spacewatch || — || align=right | 2.6 km || 
|-id=180 bgcolor=#d6d6d6
| 216180 ||  || — || October 12, 2006 || Kitt Peak || Spacewatch || KOR || align=right | 1.8 km || 
|-id=181 bgcolor=#E9E9E9
| 216181 ||  || — || October 12, 2006 || Kitt Peak || Spacewatch || — || align=right | 2.2 km || 
|-id=182 bgcolor=#d6d6d6
| 216182 ||  || — || October 12, 2006 || Kitt Peak || Spacewatch || — || align=right | 3.1 km || 
|-id=183 bgcolor=#E9E9E9
| 216183 ||  || — || October 12, 2006 || Kitt Peak || Spacewatch || — || align=right | 2.9 km || 
|-id=184 bgcolor=#E9E9E9
| 216184 ||  || — || October 14, 2006 || Bergisch Gladbach || W. Bickel || — || align=right | 2.5 km || 
|-id=185 bgcolor=#fefefe
| 216185 ||  || — || October 11, 2006 || Kitt Peak || Spacewatch || — || align=right data-sort-value="0.87" | 870 m || 
|-id=186 bgcolor=#E9E9E9
| 216186 ||  || — || October 11, 2006 || Kitt Peak || Spacewatch || — || align=right | 2.3 km || 
|-id=187 bgcolor=#E9E9E9
| 216187 ||  || — || October 11, 2006 || Palomar || NEAT || — || align=right | 4.0 km || 
|-id=188 bgcolor=#E9E9E9
| 216188 ||  || — || October 12, 2006 || Kitt Peak || Spacewatch || — || align=right | 2.5 km || 
|-id=189 bgcolor=#E9E9E9
| 216189 ||  || — || October 15, 2006 || Kitt Peak || Spacewatch || — || align=right | 1.6 km || 
|-id=190 bgcolor=#E9E9E9
| 216190 ||  || — || October 3, 2006 || Mount Lemmon || Mount Lemmon Survey || — || align=right | 2.6 km || 
|-id=191 bgcolor=#E9E9E9
| 216191 ||  || — || October 11, 2006 || Palomar || NEAT || — || align=right | 2.2 km || 
|-id=192 bgcolor=#d6d6d6
| 216192 ||  || — || October 1, 2006 || Apache Point || A. C. Becker || — || align=right | 3.6 km || 
|-id=193 bgcolor=#d6d6d6
| 216193 ||  || — || October 3, 2006 || Apache Point || A. C. Becker || — || align=right | 4.8 km || 
|-id=194 bgcolor=#E9E9E9
| 216194 ||  || — || October 17, 2006 || Piszkéstető || K. Sárneczky || MAR || align=right | 1.2 km || 
|-id=195 bgcolor=#d6d6d6
| 216195 ||  || — || October 16, 2006 || Kitt Peak || Spacewatch || MEL || align=right | 4.8 km || 
|-id=196 bgcolor=#d6d6d6
| 216196 ||  || — || October 16, 2006 || Kitt Peak || Spacewatch || — || align=right | 3.0 km || 
|-id=197 bgcolor=#E9E9E9
| 216197 ||  || — || October 16, 2006 || Catalina || CSS || MAR || align=right | 1.7 km || 
|-id=198 bgcolor=#E9E9E9
| 216198 ||  || — || October 16, 2006 || Catalina || CSS || — || align=right | 2.3 km || 
|-id=199 bgcolor=#E9E9E9
| 216199 ||  || — || October 16, 2006 || Catalina || CSS || — || align=right | 1.5 km || 
|-id=200 bgcolor=#E9E9E9
| 216200 ||  || — || October 17, 2006 || Mount Lemmon || Mount Lemmon Survey || — || align=right | 4.8 km || 
|}

216201–216300 

|-bgcolor=#E9E9E9
| 216201 ||  || — || October 17, 2006 || Mount Lemmon || Mount Lemmon Survey || — || align=right | 2.6 km || 
|-id=202 bgcolor=#E9E9E9
| 216202 ||  || — || October 17, 2006 || Mount Lemmon || Mount Lemmon Survey || — || align=right | 2.1 km || 
|-id=203 bgcolor=#E9E9E9
| 216203 ||  || — || October 17, 2006 || Mount Lemmon || Mount Lemmon Survey || — || align=right | 2.9 km || 
|-id=204 bgcolor=#E9E9E9
| 216204 ||  || — || October 16, 2006 || Kitt Peak || Spacewatch || AGN || align=right | 1.5 km || 
|-id=205 bgcolor=#E9E9E9
| 216205 ||  || — || October 16, 2006 || Kitt Peak || Spacewatch || — || align=right | 1.7 km || 
|-id=206 bgcolor=#E9E9E9
| 216206 ||  || — || October 16, 2006 || Kitt Peak || Spacewatch || JUN || align=right | 1.7 km || 
|-id=207 bgcolor=#d6d6d6
| 216207 ||  || — || October 16, 2006 || Kitt Peak || Spacewatch || — || align=right | 3.3 km || 
|-id=208 bgcolor=#E9E9E9
| 216208 ||  || — || October 18, 2006 || Kitt Peak || Spacewatch || — || align=right | 1.2 km || 
|-id=209 bgcolor=#E9E9E9
| 216209 ||  || — || October 19, 2006 || Catalina || CSS || — || align=right | 4.8 km || 
|-id=210 bgcolor=#fefefe
| 216210 ||  || — || October 16, 2006 || Mount Lemmon || Mount Lemmon Survey || — || align=right | 2.0 km || 
|-id=211 bgcolor=#E9E9E9
| 216211 ||  || — || October 16, 2006 || Catalina || CSS || — || align=right | 3.1 km || 
|-id=212 bgcolor=#d6d6d6
| 216212 ||  || — || October 17, 2006 || Kitt Peak || Spacewatch || SYL7:4 || align=right | 6.5 km || 
|-id=213 bgcolor=#E9E9E9
| 216213 ||  || — || October 17, 2006 || Kitt Peak || Spacewatch || — || align=right | 2.1 km || 
|-id=214 bgcolor=#d6d6d6
| 216214 ||  || — || October 17, 2006 || Kitt Peak || Spacewatch || — || align=right | 3.2 km || 
|-id=215 bgcolor=#E9E9E9
| 216215 ||  || — || October 18, 2006 || Kitt Peak || Spacewatch || — || align=right | 1.2 km || 
|-id=216 bgcolor=#E9E9E9
| 216216 ||  || — || October 18, 2006 || Kitt Peak || Spacewatch || — || align=right | 2.9 km || 
|-id=217 bgcolor=#E9E9E9
| 216217 ||  || — || October 18, 2006 || Kitt Peak || Spacewatch || — || align=right | 2.2 km || 
|-id=218 bgcolor=#d6d6d6
| 216218 ||  || — || October 18, 2006 || Kitt Peak || Spacewatch || — || align=right | 2.6 km || 
|-id=219 bgcolor=#E9E9E9
| 216219 ||  || — || October 18, 2006 || Kitt Peak || Spacewatch || — || align=right | 3.2 km || 
|-id=220 bgcolor=#d6d6d6
| 216220 ||  || — || October 18, 2006 || Kitt Peak || Spacewatch || CHA || align=right | 2.6 km || 
|-id=221 bgcolor=#E9E9E9
| 216221 ||  || — || October 18, 2006 || Kitt Peak || Spacewatch || — || align=right | 1.2 km || 
|-id=222 bgcolor=#d6d6d6
| 216222 ||  || — || October 18, 2006 || Kitt Peak || Spacewatch || EOS || align=right | 2.5 km || 
|-id=223 bgcolor=#E9E9E9
| 216223 ||  || — || October 19, 2006 || Mount Lemmon || Mount Lemmon Survey || WAT || align=right | 2.6 km || 
|-id=224 bgcolor=#E9E9E9
| 216224 ||  || — || October 19, 2006 || Kitt Peak || Spacewatch || — || align=right | 1.5 km || 
|-id=225 bgcolor=#E9E9E9
| 216225 ||  || — || October 21, 2006 || Catalina || CSS || HEN || align=right | 1.3 km || 
|-id=226 bgcolor=#E9E9E9
| 216226 ||  || — || October 21, 2006 || Mount Lemmon || Mount Lemmon Survey || — || align=right | 2.7 km || 
|-id=227 bgcolor=#d6d6d6
| 216227 ||  || — || October 21, 2006 || Mount Lemmon || Mount Lemmon Survey || — || align=right | 3.3 km || 
|-id=228 bgcolor=#E9E9E9
| 216228 ||  || — || October 17, 2006 || Catalina || CSS || — || align=right | 3.8 km || 
|-id=229 bgcolor=#E9E9E9
| 216229 ||  || — || October 23, 2006 || Kanab || E. E. Sheridan || — || align=right | 2.2 km || 
|-id=230 bgcolor=#E9E9E9
| 216230 ||  || — || October 29, 2006 || Kitami || K. Endate || — || align=right | 2.2 km || 
|-id=231 bgcolor=#E9E9E9
| 216231 ||  || — || October 19, 2006 || Kitt Peak || Spacewatch || HEN || align=right | 1.4 km || 
|-id=232 bgcolor=#E9E9E9
| 216232 ||  || — || October 20, 2006 || Kitt Peak || Spacewatch || MRX || align=right | 1.5 km || 
|-id=233 bgcolor=#E9E9E9
| 216233 ||  || — || October 23, 2006 || Mount Lemmon || Mount Lemmon Survey || — || align=right | 1.5 km || 
|-id=234 bgcolor=#d6d6d6
| 216234 ||  || — || October 27, 2006 || Mount Lemmon || Mount Lemmon Survey || KOR || align=right | 1.7 km || 
|-id=235 bgcolor=#E9E9E9
| 216235 ||  || — || October 27, 2006 || Kitt Peak || Spacewatch || — || align=right | 1.8 km || 
|-id=236 bgcolor=#E9E9E9
| 216236 ||  || — || October 28, 2006 || Kitt Peak || Spacewatch || — || align=right | 1.1 km || 
|-id=237 bgcolor=#d6d6d6
| 216237 ||  || — || October 28, 2006 || Kitt Peak || Spacewatch || — || align=right | 4.0 km || 
|-id=238 bgcolor=#d6d6d6
| 216238 ||  || — || October 28, 2006 || Kitt Peak || Spacewatch || EOS || align=right | 2.7 km || 
|-id=239 bgcolor=#E9E9E9
| 216239 ||  || — || October 20, 2006 || Kitt Peak || Spacewatch || — || align=right | 2.6 km || 
|-id=240 bgcolor=#d6d6d6
| 216240 ||  || — || November 10, 2006 || Kitt Peak || Spacewatch || EOS || align=right | 2.6 km || 
|-id=241 bgcolor=#d6d6d6
| 216241 Renzopiano ||  ||  || November 14, 2006 || Vallemare di Borbona || V. S. Casulli || EOS || align=right | 2.9 km || 
|-id=242 bgcolor=#E9E9E9
| 216242 ||  || — || November 15, 2006 || Wrightwood || J. W. Young || — || align=right | 2.7 km || 
|-id=243 bgcolor=#d6d6d6
| 216243 ||  || — || November 13, 2006 || Mount Lemmon || Mount Lemmon Survey || — || align=right | 4.7 km || 
|-id=244 bgcolor=#d6d6d6
| 216244 ||  || — || November 11, 2006 || Kitt Peak || Spacewatch || — || align=right | 5.7 km || 
|-id=245 bgcolor=#E9E9E9
| 216245 ||  || — || November 11, 2006 || Kitt Peak || Spacewatch || — || align=right | 3.2 km || 
|-id=246 bgcolor=#E9E9E9
| 216246 ||  || — || November 14, 2006 || Socorro || LINEAR || — || align=right | 3.3 km || 
|-id=247 bgcolor=#d6d6d6
| 216247 ||  || — || November 14, 2006 || Socorro || LINEAR || — || align=right | 4.9 km || 
|-id=248 bgcolor=#E9E9E9
| 216248 ||  || — || November 14, 2006 || Mount Lemmon || Mount Lemmon Survey || — || align=right | 1.5 km || 
|-id=249 bgcolor=#d6d6d6
| 216249 ||  || — || November 11, 2006 || Kitt Peak || Spacewatch || VER || align=right | 4.0 km || 
|-id=250 bgcolor=#E9E9E9
| 216250 ||  || — || November 13, 2006 || Kitt Peak || Spacewatch || AGN || align=right | 1.7 km || 
|-id=251 bgcolor=#E9E9E9
| 216251 ||  || — || November 13, 2006 || Catalina || CSS || — || align=right | 2.0 km || 
|-id=252 bgcolor=#d6d6d6
| 216252 ||  || — || November 13, 2006 || Kitt Peak || Spacewatch || TEL || align=right | 1.8 km || 
|-id=253 bgcolor=#d6d6d6
| 216253 ||  || — || November 13, 2006 || Kitt Peak || Spacewatch || EOS || align=right | 3.6 km || 
|-id=254 bgcolor=#d6d6d6
| 216254 ||  || — || November 15, 2006 || Kitt Peak || Spacewatch || — || align=right | 3.8 km || 
|-id=255 bgcolor=#E9E9E9
| 216255 ||  || — || November 15, 2006 || Catalina || CSS || — || align=right | 3.5 km || 
|-id=256 bgcolor=#E9E9E9
| 216256 ||  || — || November 15, 2006 || Kitt Peak || Spacewatch || GER || align=right | 1.9 km || 
|-id=257 bgcolor=#E9E9E9
| 216257 ||  || — || November 8, 2006 || Palomar || NEAT || MAR || align=right | 1.7 km || 
|-id=258 bgcolor=#FFC2E0
| 216258 ||  || — || November 18, 2006 || La Sagra || OAM Obs. || APOPHA || align=right data-sort-value="0.31" | 310 m || 
|-id=259 bgcolor=#fefefe
| 216259 ||  || — || November 16, 2006 || Mount Lemmon || Mount Lemmon Survey || FLO || align=right data-sort-value="0.93" | 930 m || 
|-id=260 bgcolor=#d6d6d6
| 216260 ||  || — || November 16, 2006 || Mount Lemmon || Mount Lemmon Survey || — || align=right | 3.4 km || 
|-id=261 bgcolor=#d6d6d6
| 216261 Mapihsia ||  ||  || November 16, 2006 || Lulin Observatory || M.-T. Chang, Q.-z. Ye || — || align=right | 4.5 km || 
|-id=262 bgcolor=#E9E9E9
| 216262 ||  || — || November 17, 2006 || Kitt Peak || Spacewatch || — || align=right | 1.8 km || 
|-id=263 bgcolor=#d6d6d6
| 216263 ||  || — || November 16, 2006 || Mount Lemmon || Mount Lemmon Survey || EOS || align=right | 2.5 km || 
|-id=264 bgcolor=#d6d6d6
| 216264 ||  || — || November 16, 2006 || Kitt Peak || Spacewatch || — || align=right | 3.3 km || 
|-id=265 bgcolor=#FA8072
| 216265 ||  || — || November 17, 2006 || Socorro || LINEAR || — || align=right data-sort-value="0.94" | 940 m || 
|-id=266 bgcolor=#d6d6d6
| 216266 ||  || — || November 17, 2006 || Kitt Peak || Spacewatch || — || align=right | 4.1 km || 
|-id=267 bgcolor=#d6d6d6
| 216267 ||  || — || November 18, 2006 || Kitt Peak || Spacewatch || HYG || align=right | 3.1 km || 
|-id=268 bgcolor=#d6d6d6
| 216268 ||  || — || November 18, 2006 || Kitt Peak || Spacewatch || — || align=right | 4.0 km || 
|-id=269 bgcolor=#d6d6d6
| 216269 ||  || — || November 18, 2006 || Kitt Peak || Spacewatch || — || align=right | 3.1 km || 
|-id=270 bgcolor=#fefefe
| 216270 ||  || — || November 19, 2006 || Kitt Peak || Spacewatch || MAS || align=right | 1.1 km || 
|-id=271 bgcolor=#E9E9E9
| 216271 ||  || — || November 19, 2006 || Socorro || LINEAR || — || align=right | 3.6 km || 
|-id=272 bgcolor=#d6d6d6
| 216272 ||  || — || November 19, 2006 || Kitt Peak || Spacewatch || — || align=right | 4.3 km || 
|-id=273 bgcolor=#d6d6d6
| 216273 ||  || — || November 16, 2006 || Nyukasa || Mount Nyukasa Stn. || EOS || align=right | 2.6 km || 
|-id=274 bgcolor=#d6d6d6
| 216274 ||  || — || November 20, 2006 || Kitt Peak || Spacewatch || KOR || align=right | 1.8 km || 
|-id=275 bgcolor=#E9E9E9
| 216275 ||  || — || November 23, 2006 || Kitt Peak || Spacewatch || — || align=right | 1.9 km || 
|-id=276 bgcolor=#E9E9E9
| 216276 ||  || — || November 23, 2006 || Kitt Peak || Spacewatch || — || align=right | 2.7 km || 
|-id=277 bgcolor=#E9E9E9
| 216277 ||  || — || November 24, 2006 || Kitt Peak || Spacewatch || — || align=right | 2.8 km || 
|-id=278 bgcolor=#d6d6d6
| 216278 ||  || — || November 27, 2006 || Catalina || CSS || — || align=right | 3.9 km || 
|-id=279 bgcolor=#d6d6d6
| 216279 ||  || — || November 25, 2006 || Kitt Peak || Spacewatch || — || align=right | 4.2 km || 
|-id=280 bgcolor=#fefefe
| 216280 ||  || — || December 10, 2006 || Kitt Peak || Spacewatch || — || align=right data-sort-value="0.96" | 960 m || 
|-id=281 bgcolor=#d6d6d6
| 216281 ||  || — || December 11, 2006 || Kitt Peak || Spacewatch || — || align=right | 4.6 km || 
|-id=282 bgcolor=#d6d6d6
| 216282 ||  || — || December 12, 2006 || Mount Lemmon || Mount Lemmon Survey || — || align=right | 4.3 km || 
|-id=283 bgcolor=#d6d6d6
| 216283 ||  || — || December 12, 2006 || Catalina || CSS || — || align=right | 3.7 km || 
|-id=284 bgcolor=#E9E9E9
| 216284 ||  || — || December 11, 2006 || Catalina || CSS || ADE || align=right | 3.2 km || 
|-id=285 bgcolor=#d6d6d6
| 216285 ||  || — || December 15, 2006 || Kitt Peak || Spacewatch || — || align=right | 5.1 km || 
|-id=286 bgcolor=#d6d6d6
| 216286 ||  || — || December 21, 2006 || Catalina || CSS || URS || align=right | 5.4 km || 
|-id=287 bgcolor=#d6d6d6
| 216287 ||  || — || January 7, 2007 || Eskridge || Farpoint Obs. || — || align=right | 4.7 km || 
|-id=288 bgcolor=#d6d6d6
| 216288 ||  || — || January 8, 2007 || Mount Lemmon || Mount Lemmon Survey || — || align=right | 4.0 km || 
|-id=289 bgcolor=#E9E9E9
| 216289 ||  || — || January 17, 2007 || Palomar || NEAT || HNS || align=right | 2.0 km || 
|-id=290 bgcolor=#fefefe
| 216290 ||  || — || March 9, 2007 || Mount Lemmon || Mount Lemmon Survey || — || align=right | 1.0 km || 
|-id=291 bgcolor=#C2FFFF
| 216291 ||  || — || March 12, 2007 || Mount Lemmon || Mount Lemmon Survey || L5 || align=right | 12 km || 
|-id=292 bgcolor=#C2FFFF
| 216292 ||  || — || March 15, 2007 || Kitt Peak || Spacewatch || L5 || align=right | 10 km || 
|-id=293 bgcolor=#C2FFFF
| 216293 ||  || — || April 11, 2007 || Kitt Peak || Spacewatch || L5 || align=right | 11 km || 
|-id=294 bgcolor=#E9E9E9
| 216294 ||  || — || May 24, 2007 || Tiki || S. F. Hönig, N. Teamo || MIS || align=right | 3.2 km || 
|-id=295 bgcolor=#d6d6d6
| 216295 Menorca ||  ||  || June 11, 2007 || La Sagra || OAM Obs. || — || align=right | 3.9 km || 
|-id=296 bgcolor=#E9E9E9
| 216296 ||  || — || June 13, 2007 || Kitt Peak || Spacewatch || — || align=right | 2.8 km || 
|-id=297 bgcolor=#d6d6d6
| 216297 ||  || — || June 16, 2007 || Kitt Peak || Spacewatch || — || align=right | 4.5 km || 
|-id=298 bgcolor=#fefefe
| 216298 ||  || — || September 8, 2007 || Mount Lemmon || Mount Lemmon Survey || — || align=right | 1.3 km || 
|-id=299 bgcolor=#fefefe
| 216299 ||  || — || September 10, 2007 || Mount Lemmon || Mount Lemmon Survey || H || align=right data-sort-value="0.67" | 670 m || 
|-id=300 bgcolor=#d6d6d6
| 216300 ||  || — || September 12, 2007 || Catalina || CSS || EUP || align=right | 4.5 km || 
|}

216301–216400 

|-bgcolor=#fefefe
| 216301 ||  || — || September 14, 2007 || Mount Lemmon || Mount Lemmon Survey || — || align=right | 1.1 km || 
|-id=302 bgcolor=#d6d6d6
| 216302 ||  || — || September 12, 2007 || Anderson Mesa || LONEOS || 7:4 || align=right | 6.8 km || 
|-id=303 bgcolor=#d6d6d6
| 216303 ||  || — || September 14, 2007 || Mount Lemmon || Mount Lemmon Survey || 628 || align=right | 3.4 km || 
|-id=304 bgcolor=#fefefe
| 216304 ||  || — || September 18, 2007 || Kitt Peak || Spacewatch || — || align=right | 1.3 km || 
|-id=305 bgcolor=#fefefe
| 216305 ||  || — || October 6, 2007 || Socorro || LINEAR || H || align=right data-sort-value="0.69" | 690 m || 
|-id=306 bgcolor=#d6d6d6
| 216306 ||  || — || October 4, 2007 || Kitt Peak || Spacewatch || — || align=right | 2.9 km || 
|-id=307 bgcolor=#C2FFFF
| 216307 ||  || — || October 5, 2007 || Kitt Peak || Spacewatch || L4 || align=right | 10 km || 
|-id=308 bgcolor=#fefefe
| 216308 ||  || — || October 8, 2007 || Mount Lemmon || Mount Lemmon Survey || — || align=right data-sort-value="0.97" | 970 m || 
|-id=309 bgcolor=#fefefe
| 216309 ||  || — || October 6, 2007 || Kitt Peak || Spacewatch || MAS || align=right data-sort-value="0.92" | 920 m || 
|-id=310 bgcolor=#fefefe
| 216310 ||  || — || October 6, 2007 || Kitt Peak || Spacewatch || — || align=right data-sort-value="0.73" | 730 m || 
|-id=311 bgcolor=#fefefe
| 216311 ||  || — || October 9, 2007 || Catalina || CSS || PHO || align=right | 1.7 km || 
|-id=312 bgcolor=#E9E9E9
| 216312 ||  || — || October 8, 2007 || Socorro || LINEAR || MIT || align=right | 4.6 km || 
|-id=313 bgcolor=#fefefe
| 216313 ||  || — || October 9, 2007 || Socorro || LINEAR || — || align=right | 1.2 km || 
|-id=314 bgcolor=#fefefe
| 216314 ||  || — || October 13, 2007 || Socorro || LINEAR || PHO || align=right | 1.5 km || 
|-id=315 bgcolor=#fefefe
| 216315 ||  || — || October 7, 2007 || Mount Lemmon || Mount Lemmon Survey || — || align=right data-sort-value="0.95" | 950 m || 
|-id=316 bgcolor=#fefefe
| 216316 ||  || — || October 8, 2007 || Kitt Peak || Spacewatch || V || align=right data-sort-value="0.87" | 870 m || 
|-id=317 bgcolor=#fefefe
| 216317 ||  || — || October 8, 2007 || Kitt Peak || Spacewatch || — || align=right data-sort-value="0.92" | 920 m || 
|-id=318 bgcolor=#E9E9E9
| 216318 ||  || — || October 7, 2007 || Catalina || CSS || EUN || align=right | 1.3 km || 
|-id=319 bgcolor=#E9E9E9
| 216319 Sanxia ||  ||  || October 10, 2007 || XuYi || PMO NEO || — || align=right | 2.8 km || 
|-id=320 bgcolor=#d6d6d6
| 216320 ||  || — || October 8, 2007 || Anderson Mesa || LONEOS || — || align=right | 4.3 km || 
|-id=321 bgcolor=#d6d6d6
| 216321 ||  || — || October 14, 2007 || Mount Lemmon || Mount Lemmon Survey || — || align=right | 3.7 km || 
|-id=322 bgcolor=#fefefe
| 216322 ||  || — || October 16, 2007 || Kitt Peak || Spacewatch || — || align=right data-sort-value="0.86" | 860 m || 
|-id=323 bgcolor=#d6d6d6
| 216323 ||  || — || October 20, 2007 || Mount Lemmon || Mount Lemmon Survey || — || align=right | 4.3 km || 
|-id=324 bgcolor=#fefefe
| 216324 ||  || — || October 30, 2007 || Kitt Peak || Spacewatch || — || align=right | 1.2 km || 
|-id=325 bgcolor=#fefefe
| 216325 ||  || — || October 30, 2007 || Kitt Peak || Spacewatch || FLO || align=right data-sort-value="0.83" | 830 m || 
|-id=326 bgcolor=#fefefe
| 216326 ||  || — || October 31, 2007 || Mount Lemmon || Mount Lemmon Survey || — || align=right | 1.1 km || 
|-id=327 bgcolor=#d6d6d6
| 216327 ||  || — || October 16, 2007 || Kitt Peak || Spacewatch || — || align=right | 3.7 km || 
|-id=328 bgcolor=#fefefe
| 216328 ||  || — || November 5, 2007 || Catalina || CSS || H || align=right data-sort-value="0.83" | 830 m || 
|-id=329 bgcolor=#fefefe
| 216329 ||  || — || November 2, 2007 || Mount Lemmon || Mount Lemmon Survey || V || align=right data-sort-value="0.97" | 970 m || 
|-id=330 bgcolor=#fefefe
| 216330 ||  || — || November 7, 2007 || Bisei SG Center || BATTeRS || NYS || align=right data-sort-value="0.81" | 810 m || 
|-id=331 bgcolor=#fefefe
| 216331 Panjunhua ||  ||  || November 5, 2007 || XuYi || PMO NEO || — || align=right | 2.0 km || 
|-id=332 bgcolor=#d6d6d6
| 216332 ||  || — || November 2, 2007 || Catalina || CSS || — || align=right | 4.9 km || 
|-id=333 bgcolor=#E9E9E9
| 216333 ||  || — || November 4, 2007 || Mount Lemmon || Mount Lemmon Survey || — || align=right | 2.2 km || 
|-id=334 bgcolor=#E9E9E9
| 216334 ||  || — || November 4, 2007 || Mount Lemmon || Mount Lemmon Survey || HEN || align=right | 1.7 km || 
|-id=335 bgcolor=#fefefe
| 216335 ||  || — || November 9, 2007 || Kitt Peak || Spacewatch || NYS || align=right data-sort-value="0.92" | 920 m || 
|-id=336 bgcolor=#d6d6d6
| 216336 ||  || — || November 14, 2007 || Mount Lemmon || Mount Lemmon Survey || — || align=right | 4.1 km || 
|-id=337 bgcolor=#E9E9E9
| 216337 ||  || — || November 3, 2007 || Mount Lemmon || Mount Lemmon Survey || AGN || align=right | 1.3 km || 
|-id=338 bgcolor=#E9E9E9
| 216338 ||  || — || November 18, 2007 || Mount Lemmon || Mount Lemmon Survey || — || align=right | 1.3 km || 
|-id=339 bgcolor=#fefefe
| 216339 ||  || — || November 18, 2007 || Mount Lemmon || Mount Lemmon Survey || — || align=right | 1.4 km || 
|-id=340 bgcolor=#fefefe
| 216340 ||  || — || November 19, 2007 || Mount Lemmon || Mount Lemmon Survey || — || align=right | 1.0 km || 
|-id=341 bgcolor=#d6d6d6
| 216341 ||  || — || November 20, 2007 || Mount Lemmon || Mount Lemmon Survey || — || align=right | 3.4 km || 
|-id=342 bgcolor=#fefefe
| 216342 ||  || — || November 28, 2007 || Marly || P. Kocher || NYS || align=right data-sort-value="0.95" | 950 m || 
|-id=343 bgcolor=#E9E9E9
| 216343 Wenchang ||  ||  || November 28, 2007 || Lulin Observatory || Q.-z. Ye, H.-C. Lin || — || align=right | 2.1 km || 
|-id=344 bgcolor=#fefefe
| 216344 ||  || — || December 3, 2007 || Catalina || CSS || — || align=right data-sort-value="0.89" | 890 m || 
|-id=345 bgcolor=#E9E9E9
| 216345 Savigliano ||  ||  || December 4, 2007 || San Marcello || L. Tesi, M. Mazzucato || — || align=right | 2.1 km || 
|-id=346 bgcolor=#d6d6d6
| 216346 ||  || — || December 14, 2007 || Dauban || Chante-Perdrix Obs. || TIR || align=right | 5.1 km || 
|-id=347 bgcolor=#E9E9E9
| 216347 ||  || — || December 16, 2007 || Kitt Peak || Spacewatch || — || align=right | 2.4 km || 
|-id=348 bgcolor=#E9E9E9
| 216348 ||  || — || December 16, 2007 || Kitt Peak || Spacewatch || ADE || align=right | 2.3 km || 
|-id=349 bgcolor=#fefefe
| 216349 ||  || — || December 30, 2007 || Mount Lemmon || Mount Lemmon Survey || — || align=right data-sort-value="0.83" | 830 m || 
|-id=350 bgcolor=#E9E9E9
| 216350 ||  || — || December 30, 2007 || Kitt Peak || Spacewatch || — || align=right | 3.3 km || 
|-id=351 bgcolor=#E9E9E9
| 216351 ||  || — || December 30, 2007 || Mount Lemmon || Mount Lemmon Survey || — || align=right | 4.0 km || 
|-id=352 bgcolor=#E9E9E9
| 216352 ||  || — || December 30, 2007 || Kitt Peak || Spacewatch || — || align=right | 2.4 km || 
|-id=353 bgcolor=#d6d6d6
| 216353 ||  || — || December 30, 2007 || Catalina || CSS || — || align=right | 5.1 km || 
|-id=354 bgcolor=#E9E9E9
| 216354 ||  || — || December 30, 2007 || Kitt Peak || Spacewatch || — || align=right | 2.2 km || 
|-id=355 bgcolor=#d6d6d6
| 216355 ||  || — || December 30, 2007 || Mount Lemmon || Mount Lemmon Survey || — || align=right | 3.5 km || 
|-id=356 bgcolor=#fefefe
| 216356 ||  || — || January 10, 2008 || Mount Lemmon || Mount Lemmon Survey || FLO || align=right data-sort-value="0.80" | 800 m || 
|-id=357 bgcolor=#E9E9E9
| 216357 ||  || — || January 10, 2008 || Mount Lemmon || Mount Lemmon Survey || — || align=right | 2.1 km || 
|-id=358 bgcolor=#E9E9E9
| 216358 ||  || — || January 10, 2008 || Kitt Peak || Spacewatch || WIT || align=right | 1.0 km || 
|-id=359 bgcolor=#d6d6d6
| 216359 ||  || — || January 10, 2008 || Mount Lemmon || Mount Lemmon Survey || KOR || align=right | 1.6 km || 
|-id=360 bgcolor=#d6d6d6
| 216360 ||  || — || January 11, 2008 || Kitt Peak || Spacewatch || THM || align=right | 2.8 km || 
|-id=361 bgcolor=#E9E9E9
| 216361 ||  || — || January 11, 2008 || Mount Lemmon || Mount Lemmon Survey || — || align=right | 3.5 km || 
|-id=362 bgcolor=#E9E9E9
| 216362 ||  || — || January 15, 2008 || Mount Lemmon || Mount Lemmon Survey || — || align=right | 2.3 km || 
|-id=363 bgcolor=#E9E9E9
| 216363 ||  || — || January 13, 2008 || Kitt Peak || Spacewatch || AGN || align=right | 1.4 km || 
|-id=364 bgcolor=#E9E9E9
| 216364 ||  || — || January 12, 2008 || Mount Lemmon || Mount Lemmon Survey || AST || align=right | 3.5 km || 
|-id=365 bgcolor=#fefefe
| 216365 ||  || — || January 13, 2008 || Kitt Peak || Spacewatch || — || align=right data-sort-value="0.94" | 940 m || 
|-id=366 bgcolor=#E9E9E9
| 216366 ||  || — || January 14, 2008 || Kitt Peak || Spacewatch || WIT || align=right | 1.3 km || 
|-id=367 bgcolor=#E9E9E9
| 216367 ||  || — || January 14, 2008 || Kitt Peak || Spacewatch || — || align=right | 2.7 km || 
|-id=368 bgcolor=#d6d6d6
| 216368 ||  || — || January 14, 2008 || Majorca || OAM Obs. || — || align=right | 3.4 km || 
|-id=369 bgcolor=#E9E9E9
| 216369 ||  || — || January 10, 2008 || Kitt Peak || Spacewatch || — || align=right | 2.8 km || 
|-id=370 bgcolor=#d6d6d6
| 216370 ||  || — || January 10, 2008 || Kitt Peak || Spacewatch || — || align=right | 3.0 km || 
|-id=371 bgcolor=#E9E9E9
| 216371 ||  || — || January 12, 2008 || Mount Lemmon || Mount Lemmon Survey || — || align=right | 2.6 km || 
|-id=372 bgcolor=#fefefe
| 216372 ||  || — || January 18, 2008 || Kitt Peak || Spacewatch || FLO || align=right data-sort-value="0.75" | 750 m || 
|-id=373 bgcolor=#d6d6d6
| 216373 ||  || — || January 28, 2008 || Lulin Observatory || LUSS || HYG || align=right | 3.9 km || 
|-id=374 bgcolor=#d6d6d6
| 216374 ||  || — || January 28, 2008 || Lulin Observatory || LUSS || — || align=right | 3.5 km || 
|-id=375 bgcolor=#E9E9E9
| 216375 ||  || — || January 30, 2008 || Catalina || CSS || — || align=right | 2.7 km || 
|-id=376 bgcolor=#E9E9E9
| 216376 ||  || — || January 30, 2008 || Catalina || CSS || — || align=right | 3.3 km || 
|-id=377 bgcolor=#d6d6d6
| 216377 ||  || — || January 30, 2008 || Mount Lemmon || Mount Lemmon Survey || KOR || align=right | 1.7 km || 
|-id=378 bgcolor=#d6d6d6
| 216378 ||  || — || January 30, 2008 || Kitt Peak || Spacewatch || — || align=right | 4.8 km || 
|-id=379 bgcolor=#d6d6d6
| 216379 ||  || — || January 30, 2008 || Kitt Peak || Spacewatch || — || align=right | 4.9 km || 
|-id=380 bgcolor=#d6d6d6
| 216380 ||  || — || January 30, 2008 || Socorro || LINEAR || NAE || align=right | 4.9 km || 
|-id=381 bgcolor=#E9E9E9
| 216381 ||  || — || January 30, 2008 || Kitt Peak || Spacewatch || — || align=right | 2.8 km || 
|-id=382 bgcolor=#fefefe
| 216382 ||  || — || January 30, 2008 || Catalina || CSS || — || align=right data-sort-value="0.97" | 970 m || 
|-id=383 bgcolor=#d6d6d6
| 216383 ||  || — || January 16, 2008 || Kitt Peak || Spacewatch || THM || align=right | 3.1 km || 
|-id=384 bgcolor=#d6d6d6
| 216384 ||  || — || January 17, 2008 || Kitt Peak || Spacewatch || — || align=right | 2.8 km || 
|-id=385 bgcolor=#E9E9E9
| 216385 ||  || — || January 18, 2008 || Mount Lemmon || Mount Lemmon Survey || — || align=right | 1.8 km || 
|-id=386 bgcolor=#d6d6d6
| 216386 ||  || — || February 2, 2008 || Catalina || CSS || — || align=right | 3.7 km || 
|-id=387 bgcolor=#d6d6d6
| 216387 ||  || — || February 7, 2008 || Mount Lemmon || Mount Lemmon Survey || — || align=right | 2.3 km || 
|-id=388 bgcolor=#d6d6d6
| 216388 ||  || — || February 3, 2008 || Mount Lemmon || Mount Lemmon Survey || CHAfast? || align=right | 2.7 km || 
|-id=389 bgcolor=#E9E9E9
| 216389 ||  || — || February 7, 2008 || Mount Lemmon || Mount Lemmon Survey || — || align=right | 1.9 km || 
|-id=390 bgcolor=#d6d6d6
| 216390 Binnig ||  ||  || February 14, 2008 || Taunus || E. Schwab, R. Kling || HYG || align=right | 3.1 km || 
|-id=391 bgcolor=#E9E9E9
| 216391 ||  || — || February 7, 2008 || Catalina || CSS || — || align=right | 2.9 km || 
|-id=392 bgcolor=#d6d6d6
| 216392 ||  || — || February 3, 2008 || Catalina || CSS || — || align=right | 4.7 km || 
|-id=393 bgcolor=#E9E9E9
| 216393 ||  || — || February 8, 2008 || Kitt Peak || Spacewatch || — || align=right | 2.9 km || 
|-id=394 bgcolor=#d6d6d6
| 216394 ||  || — || February 24, 2008 || Mount Lemmon || Mount Lemmon Survey || — || align=right | 4.1 km || 
|-id=395 bgcolor=#d6d6d6
| 216395 ||  || — || February 24, 2008 || Mount Lemmon || Mount Lemmon Survey || EOS || align=right | 2.8 km || 
|-id=396 bgcolor=#d6d6d6
| 216396 ||  || — || February 28, 2008 || Catalina || CSS || — || align=right | 7.1 km || 
|-id=397 bgcolor=#d6d6d6
| 216397 ||  || — || March 2, 2008 || Kitt Peak || Spacewatch || — || align=right | 3.8 km || 
|-id=398 bgcolor=#d6d6d6
| 216398 ||  || — || March 3, 2008 || Catalina || CSS || EOS || align=right | 3.5 km || 
|-id=399 bgcolor=#fefefe
| 216399 ||  || — || March 6, 2008 || Mount Lemmon || Mount Lemmon Survey || V || align=right data-sort-value="0.92" | 920 m || 
|-id=400 bgcolor=#d6d6d6
| 216400 ||  || — || March 8, 2008 || Socorro || LINEAR || VER || align=right | 5.5 km || 
|}

216401–216500 

|-bgcolor=#fefefe
| 216401 ||  || — || March 6, 2008 || Kitt Peak || Spacewatch || — || align=right data-sort-value="0.84" | 840 m || 
|-id=402 bgcolor=#d6d6d6
| 216402 ||  || — || March 7, 2008 || Mount Lemmon || Mount Lemmon Survey || KAR || align=right | 1.2 km || 
|-id=403 bgcolor=#d6d6d6
| 216403 ||  || — || March 6, 2008 || Mount Lemmon || Mount Lemmon Survey || — || align=right | 4.0 km || 
|-id=404 bgcolor=#d6d6d6
| 216404 ||  || — || March 7, 2008 || Mount Lemmon || Mount Lemmon Survey || KOR || align=right | 1.6 km || 
|-id=405 bgcolor=#d6d6d6
| 216405 ||  || — || March 11, 2008 || Mount Lemmon || Mount Lemmon Survey || — || align=right | 3.0 km || 
|-id=406 bgcolor=#fefefe
| 216406 ||  || — || March 13, 2008 || Kitt Peak || Spacewatch || — || align=right | 1.2 km || 
|-id=407 bgcolor=#d6d6d6
| 216407 ||  || — || March 27, 2008 || Kitt Peak || Spacewatch || — || align=right | 4.6 km || 
|-id=408 bgcolor=#d6d6d6
| 216408 ||  || — || March 30, 2008 || Catalina || CSS || 3:2 || align=right | 6.4 km || 
|-id=409 bgcolor=#C2FFFF
| 216409 ||  || — || April 8, 2008 || Mount Lemmon || Mount Lemmon Survey || L5 || align=right | 11 km || 
|-id=410 bgcolor=#fefefe
| 216410 ||  || — || August 28, 2008 || La Sagra || OAM Obs. || — || align=right | 1.5 km || 
|-id=411 bgcolor=#d6d6d6
| 216411 ||  || — || September 3, 2008 || Kitt Peak || Spacewatch || 3:2 || align=right | 7.2 km || 
|-id=412 bgcolor=#E9E9E9
| 216412 ||  || — || September 3, 2008 || Kitt Peak || Spacewatch || — || align=right | 3.6 km || 
|-id=413 bgcolor=#d6d6d6
| 216413 ||  || — || September 4, 2008 || Kitt Peak || Spacewatch || — || align=right | 6.5 km || 
|-id=414 bgcolor=#d6d6d6
| 216414 ||  || — || September 6, 2008 || Kitt Peak || Spacewatch || — || align=right | 3.3 km || 
|-id=415 bgcolor=#d6d6d6
| 216415 ||  || — || September 20, 2008 || Catalina || CSS || — || align=right | 4.3 km || 
|-id=416 bgcolor=#E9E9E9
| 216416 ||  || — || September 21, 2008 || Kitt Peak || Spacewatch || MIS || align=right | 3.3 km || 
|-id=417 bgcolor=#d6d6d6
| 216417 ||  || — || September 21, 2008 || Kitt Peak || Spacewatch || URS || align=right | 6.6 km || 
|-id=418 bgcolor=#d6d6d6
| 216418 ||  || — || September 21, 2008 || Kitt Peak || Spacewatch || — || align=right | 3.7 km || 
|-id=419 bgcolor=#C2FFFF
| 216419 ||  || — || September 21, 2008 || Catalina || CSS || L4 || align=right | 13 km || 
|-id=420 bgcolor=#E9E9E9
| 216420 ||  || — || September 22, 2008 || Mount Lemmon || Mount Lemmon Survey || — || align=right | 1.4 km || 
|-id=421 bgcolor=#C2FFFF
| 216421 ||  || — || October 1, 2008 || Sierra Stars || F. Tozzi || L4 || align=right | 10 km || 
|-id=422 bgcolor=#fefefe
| 216422 ||  || — || October 3, 2008 || La Sagra || OAM Obs. || FLO || align=right data-sort-value="0.77" | 770 m || 
|-id=423 bgcolor=#C2FFFF
| 216423 ||  || — || October 8, 2008 || Kitt Peak || Spacewatch || L4 || align=right | 12 km || 
|-id=424 bgcolor=#E9E9E9
| 216424 ||  || — || October 1, 2008 || Mount Lemmon || Mount Lemmon Survey || ADE || align=right | 3.5 km || 
|-id=425 bgcolor=#E9E9E9
| 216425 ||  || — || October 25, 2008 || Chante-Perdrix || Chante-Perdrix Obs. || JUL || align=right | 1.2 km || 
|-id=426 bgcolor=#E9E9E9
| 216426 ||  || — || November 17, 2008 || Kitt Peak || Spacewatch || WIT || align=right | 1.5 km || 
|-id=427 bgcolor=#E9E9E9
| 216427 ||  || — || November 24, 2008 || Sierra Stars || F. Tozzi || HNS || align=right | 1.9 km || 
|-id=428 bgcolor=#E9E9E9
| 216428 Mauricio ||  ||  || December 23, 2008 || Nazaret || G. Muler, J. M. Ruiz || — || align=right | 2.4 km || 
|-id=429 bgcolor=#fefefe
| 216429 ||  || — || January 17, 2009 || Kitt Peak || Spacewatch || — || align=right | 2.8 km || 
|-id=430 bgcolor=#fefefe
| 216430 ||  || — || January 25, 2009 || Kitt Peak || Spacewatch || MAS || align=right data-sort-value="0.97" | 970 m || 
|-id=431 bgcolor=#d6d6d6
| 216431 ||  || — || January 31, 2009 || Kitt Peak || Spacewatch || HYG || align=right | 3.7 km || 
|-id=432 bgcolor=#d6d6d6
| 216432 ||  || — || February 4, 2009 || Kitt Peak || Spacewatch || — || align=right | 5.0 km || 
|-id=433 bgcolor=#E9E9E9
| 216433 Milianleo ||  ||  || February 19, 2009 || Tzec Maun || E. Schwab || AEO || align=right | 1.5 km || 
|-id=434 bgcolor=#d6d6d6
| 216434 ||  || — || February 28, 2009 || Socorro || LINEAR || — || align=right | 4.9 km || 
|-id=435 bgcolor=#fefefe
| 216435 ||  || — || February 22, 2009 || Kitt Peak || Spacewatch || NYS || align=right data-sort-value="0.98" | 980 m || 
|-id=436 bgcolor=#d6d6d6
| 216436 ||  || — || February 26, 2009 || Catalina || CSS || — || align=right | 2.7 km || 
|-id=437 bgcolor=#E9E9E9
| 216437 ||  || — || February 27, 2009 || Kitt Peak || Spacewatch || — || align=right | 2.5 km || 
|-id=438 bgcolor=#fefefe
| 216438 ||  || — || February 27, 2009 || Kitt Peak || Spacewatch || — || align=right | 1.8 km || 
|-id=439 bgcolor=#E9E9E9
| 216439 Lyubertsy ||  ||  || March 15, 2009 || Tzec Maun || L. Elenin || — || align=right | 2.5 km || 
|-id=440 bgcolor=#fefefe
| 216440 ||  || — || March 15, 2009 || La Sagra || OAM Obs. || MAS || align=right data-sort-value="0.99" | 990 m || 
|-id=441 bgcolor=#fefefe
| 216441 ||  || — || March 15, 2009 || La Sagra || OAM Obs. || MAS || align=right data-sort-value="0.90" | 900 m || 
|-id=442 bgcolor=#fefefe
| 216442 ||  || — || March 18, 2009 || Črni Vrh || Črni Vrh || H || align=right data-sort-value="0.92" | 920 m || 
|-id=443 bgcolor=#E9E9E9
| 216443 ||  || — || March 18, 2009 || Bergisch Gladbach || W. Bickel || — || align=right | 3.4 km || 
|-id=444 bgcolor=#fefefe
| 216444 ||  || — || March 19, 2009 || La Sagra || OAM Obs. || EUT || align=right data-sort-value="0.86" | 860 m || 
|-id=445 bgcolor=#fefefe
| 216445 ||  || — || March 21, 2009 || Catalina || CSS || NYS || align=right data-sort-value="0.79" | 790 m || 
|-id=446 bgcolor=#d6d6d6
| 216446 Nanshida ||  ||  || March 25, 2009 || XuYi || PMO NEO || — || align=right | 4.7 km || 
|-id=447 bgcolor=#fefefe
| 216447 ||  || — || March 26, 2009 || Kitt Peak || Spacewatch || NYS || align=right data-sort-value="0.99" | 990 m || 
|-id=448 bgcolor=#fefefe
| 216448 ||  || — || March 28, 2009 || Kitt Peak || Spacewatch || — || align=right | 1.1 km || 
|-id=449 bgcolor=#d6d6d6
| 216449 ||  || — || April 3, 2009 || Cerro Burek || Alianza S4 Obs. || THM || align=right | 4.0 km || 
|-id=450 bgcolor=#fefefe
| 216450 ||  || — || April 16, 2009 || Catalina || CSS || — || align=right | 1.3 km || 
|-id=451 bgcolor=#fefefe
| 216451 Irsha ||  ||  || April 19, 2009 || Andrushivka || Andrushivka Obs. || ERI || align=right | 2.0 km || 
|-id=452 bgcolor=#fefefe
| 216452 ||  || — || April 16, 2009 || Catalina || CSS || MAS || align=right | 1.1 km || 
|-id=453 bgcolor=#d6d6d6
| 216453 ||  || — || April 17, 2009 || Kitt Peak || Spacewatch || TEL || align=right | 1.8 km || 
|-id=454 bgcolor=#E9E9E9
| 216454 ||  || — || April 17, 2009 || Kitt Peak || Spacewatch || — || align=right | 2.8 km || 
|-id=455 bgcolor=#E9E9E9
| 216455 ||  || — || April 19, 2009 || Kitt Peak || Spacewatch || — || align=right | 1.9 km || 
|-id=456 bgcolor=#E9E9E9
| 216456 ||  || — || April 19, 2009 || Catalina || CSS || — || align=right | 1.6 km || 
|-id=457 bgcolor=#fefefe
| 216457 ||  || — || April 20, 2009 || La Sagra || OAM Obs. || — || align=right | 1.2 km || 
|-id=458 bgcolor=#E9E9E9
| 216458 ||  || — || April 20, 2009 || Socorro || LINEAR || — || align=right | 1.7 km || 
|-id=459 bgcolor=#fefefe
| 216459 ||  || — || April 22, 2009 || Kitt Peak || Spacewatch || V || align=right | 1.0 km || 
|-id=460 bgcolor=#E9E9E9
| 216460 || 250 T-2 || — || September 29, 1973 || Palomar || PLS || — || align=right | 3.5 km || 
|-id=461 bgcolor=#d6d6d6
| 216461 || 2025 T-2 || — || September 29, 1973 || Palomar || PLS || HYG || align=right | 4.2 km || 
|-id=462 bgcolor=#C2FFFF
| 216462 Polyphontes || 5397 T-2 ||  || September 30, 1973 || Palomar || PLS || L4 || align=right | 10 km || 
|-id=463 bgcolor=#d6d6d6
| 216463 || 1849 T-3 || — || October 17, 1977 || Palomar || PLS || — || align=right | 4.9 km || 
|-id=464 bgcolor=#FA8072
| 216464 ||  || — || August 12, 1974 || Palomar || T. Gehrels || — || align=right data-sort-value="0.85" | 850 m || 
|-id=465 bgcolor=#fefefe
| 216465 ||  || — || November 15, 1995 || Kitt Peak || Spacewatch || V || align=right data-sort-value="0.76" | 760 m || 
|-id=466 bgcolor=#d6d6d6
| 216466 ||  || — || January 13, 1996 || Kitt Peak || Spacewatch || — || align=right | 3.8 km || 
|-id=467 bgcolor=#E9E9E9
| 216467 ||  || — || June 16, 1996 || Kitt Peak || Spacewatch || — || align=right | 2.1 km || 
|-id=468 bgcolor=#fefefe
| 216468 ||  || — || December 5, 1996 || Kitt Peak || Spacewatch || — || align=right | 1.2 km || 
|-id=469 bgcolor=#fefefe
| 216469 ||  || — || February 3, 1997 || Kitt Peak || Spacewatch || NYS || align=right data-sort-value="0.80" | 800 m || 
|-id=470 bgcolor=#E9E9E9
| 216470 ||  || — || October 28, 1997 || Kitt Peak || Spacewatch || — || align=right | 2.7 km || 
|-id=471 bgcolor=#fefefe
| 216471 ||  || — || November 23, 1997 || Kitt Peak || Spacewatch || FLO || align=right data-sort-value="0.89" | 890 m || 
|-id=472 bgcolor=#d6d6d6
| 216472 ||  || — || May 13, 1999 || Socorro || LINEAR || EUP || align=right | 6.1 km || 
|-id=473 bgcolor=#d6d6d6
| 216473 ||  || — || September 7, 1999 || Socorro || LINEAR || — || align=right | 4.2 km || 
|-id=474 bgcolor=#fefefe
| 216474 ||  || — || September 7, 1999 || Socorro || LINEAR || — || align=right | 1.0 km || 
|-id=475 bgcolor=#d6d6d6
| 216475 ||  || — || September 8, 1999 || Socorro || LINEAR || — || align=right | 3.8 km || 
|-id=476 bgcolor=#E9E9E9
| 216476 ||  || — || September 23, 1999 || Ondřejov || Ondřejov Obs. || — || align=right | 2.4 km || 
|-id=477 bgcolor=#fefefe
| 216477 ||  || — || October 3, 1999 || Socorro || LINEAR || NYS || align=right data-sort-value="0.84" | 840 m || 
|-id=478 bgcolor=#d6d6d6
| 216478 ||  || — || October 14, 1999 || Socorro || LINEAR || URS || align=right | 4.8 km || 
|-id=479 bgcolor=#fefefe
| 216479 ||  || — || October 3, 1999 || Catalina || CSS || FLO || align=right | 1.1 km || 
|-id=480 bgcolor=#d6d6d6
| 216480 ||  || — || October 28, 1999 || Catalina || CSS || — || align=right | 6.2 km || 
|-id=481 bgcolor=#d6d6d6
| 216481 ||  || — || November 3, 1999 || Socorro || LINEAR || — || align=right | 5.2 km || 
|-id=482 bgcolor=#fefefe
| 216482 ||  || — || November 3, 1999 || Socorro || LINEAR || H || align=right data-sort-value="0.95" | 950 m || 
|-id=483 bgcolor=#fefefe
| 216483 ||  || — || November 3, 1999 || Socorro || LINEAR || H || align=right data-sort-value="0.84" | 840 m || 
|-id=484 bgcolor=#fefefe
| 216484 ||  || — || November 6, 1999 || Kitt Peak || Spacewatch || MAS || align=right data-sort-value="0.94" | 940 m || 
|-id=485 bgcolor=#fefefe
| 216485 ||  || — || November 4, 1999 || Kitt Peak || Spacewatch || — || align=right | 1.1 km || 
|-id=486 bgcolor=#fefefe
| 216486 ||  || — || November 5, 1999 || Kitt Peak || Spacewatch || MAS || align=right data-sort-value="0.88" | 880 m || 
|-id=487 bgcolor=#d6d6d6
| 216487 ||  || — || November 9, 1999 || Socorro || LINEAR || — || align=right | 7.6 km || 
|-id=488 bgcolor=#d6d6d6
| 216488 ||  || — || November 15, 1999 || Socorro || LINEAR || — || align=right | 4.3 km || 
|-id=489 bgcolor=#fefefe
| 216489 ||  || — || November 4, 1999 || Socorro || LINEAR || FLO || align=right | 1.2 km || 
|-id=490 bgcolor=#d6d6d6
| 216490 ||  || — || December 5, 1999 || Catalina || CSS || — || align=right | 5.3 km || 
|-id=491 bgcolor=#fefefe
| 216491 ||  || — || December 6, 1999 || Socorro || LINEAR || H || align=right data-sort-value="0.85" | 850 m || 
|-id=492 bgcolor=#E9E9E9
| 216492 ||  || — || December 10, 1999 || Socorro || LINEAR || — || align=right | 3.6 km || 
|-id=493 bgcolor=#d6d6d6
| 216493 ||  || — || December 31, 1999 || Kitt Peak || Spacewatch || — || align=right | 4.7 km || 
|-id=494 bgcolor=#d6d6d6
| 216494 ||  || — || January 4, 2000 || Socorro || LINEAR || — || align=right | 9.0 km || 
|-id=495 bgcolor=#fefefe
| 216495 ||  || — || January 9, 2000 || Socorro || LINEAR || H || align=right | 1.2 km || 
|-id=496 bgcolor=#fefefe
| 216496 ||  || — || January 6, 2000 || Kitt Peak || Spacewatch || — || align=right | 1.4 km || 
|-id=497 bgcolor=#E9E9E9
| 216497 ||  || — || January 8, 2000 || Kitt Peak || Spacewatch || — || align=right | 1.9 km || 
|-id=498 bgcolor=#fefefe
| 216498 ||  || — || January 26, 2000 || Kitt Peak || Spacewatch || NYS || align=right data-sort-value="0.88" | 880 m || 
|-id=499 bgcolor=#E9E9E9
| 216499 ||  || — || February 2, 2000 || Socorro || LINEAR || — || align=right | 1.6 km || 
|-id=500 bgcolor=#E9E9E9
| 216500 ||  || — || February 26, 2000 || Kitt Peak || Spacewatch || — || align=right | 3.1 km || 
|}

216501–216600 

|-bgcolor=#E9E9E9
| 216501 ||  || — || March 5, 2000 || Cerro Tololo || DLS || — || align=right | 1.7 km || 
|-id=502 bgcolor=#E9E9E9
| 216502 ||  || — || April 5, 2000 || Socorro || LINEAR || GEF || align=right | 1.8 km || 
|-id=503 bgcolor=#E9E9E9
| 216503 ||  || — || April 25, 2000 || Anderson Mesa || LONEOS || — || align=right | 2.2 km || 
|-id=504 bgcolor=#E9E9E9
| 216504 ||  || — || April 25, 2000 || Anderson Mesa || LONEOS || — || align=right | 3.1 km || 
|-id=505 bgcolor=#E9E9E9
| 216505 ||  || — || May 5, 2000 || Socorro || LINEAR || ADE || align=right | 3.2 km || 
|-id=506 bgcolor=#E9E9E9
| 216506 ||  || — || September 1, 2000 || Socorro || LINEAR || — || align=right | 4.7 km || 
|-id=507 bgcolor=#E9E9E9
| 216507 ||  || — || September 5, 2000 || Socorro || LONEOS || INO || align=right | 2.4 km || 
|-id=508 bgcolor=#fefefe
| 216508 ||  || — || September 3, 2000 || Socorro || LINEAR || — || align=right | 1.2 km || 
|-id=509 bgcolor=#fefefe
| 216509 ||  || — || September 24, 2000 || Socorro || LINEAR || — || align=right | 1.4 km || 
|-id=510 bgcolor=#d6d6d6
| 216510 ||  || — || September 24, 2000 || Socorro || LINEAR || — || align=right | 3.3 km || 
|-id=511 bgcolor=#d6d6d6
| 216511 ||  || — || September 24, 2000 || Socorro || LINEAR || EOS || align=right | 3.2 km || 
|-id=512 bgcolor=#fefefe
| 216512 ||  || — || September 27, 2000 || Socorro || LINEAR || FLO || align=right data-sort-value="0.89" | 890 m || 
|-id=513 bgcolor=#d6d6d6
| 216513 ||  || — || September 26, 2000 || Socorro || LINEAR || — || align=right | 4.3 km || 
|-id=514 bgcolor=#fefefe
| 216514 ||  || — || October 24, 2000 || Socorro || LINEAR || — || align=right | 1.3 km || 
|-id=515 bgcolor=#fefefe
| 216515 ||  || — || November 1, 2000 || Socorro || LINEAR || — || align=right data-sort-value="0.93" | 930 m || 
|-id=516 bgcolor=#fefefe
| 216516 ||  || — || November 26, 2000 || Needville || Needville Obs. || V || align=right | 1.1 km || 
|-id=517 bgcolor=#fefefe
| 216517 ||  || — || November 17, 2000 || Kitt Peak || Spacewatch || — || align=right | 1.1 km || 
|-id=518 bgcolor=#d6d6d6
| 216518 ||  || — || December 30, 2000 || Socorro || LINEAR || — || align=right | 6.0 km || 
|-id=519 bgcolor=#FA8072
| 216519 ||  || — || March 17, 2001 || Socorro || LINEAR || — || align=right | 1.2 km || 
|-id=520 bgcolor=#fefefe
| 216520 ||  || — || March 19, 2001 || Socorro || LINEAR || — || align=right | 1.3 km || 
|-id=521 bgcolor=#fefefe
| 216521 ||  || — || March 18, 2001 || Socorro || LINEAR || — || align=right | 1.7 km || 
|-id=522 bgcolor=#E9E9E9
| 216522 ||  || — || April 18, 2001 || Kitt Peak || Spacewatch || HOF || align=right | 5.0 km || 
|-id=523 bgcolor=#FFC2E0
| 216523 ||  || — || April 18, 2001 || Socorro || LINEAR || ATEPHAcritical || align=right data-sort-value="0.27" | 270 m || 
|-id=524 bgcolor=#fefefe
| 216524 ||  || — || April 27, 2001 || Modra || A. Galád, J. Tóth || — || align=right | 1.5 km || 
|-id=525 bgcolor=#E9E9E9
| 216525 ||  || — || June 25, 2001 || Haleakalā || NEAT || — || align=right | 2.2 km || 
|-id=526 bgcolor=#E9E9E9
| 216526 ||  || — || July 12, 2001 || Palomar || NEAT || — || align=right | 2.0 km || 
|-id=527 bgcolor=#E9E9E9
| 216527 ||  || — || July 17, 2001 || Anderson Mesa || LONEOS || — || align=right | 2.7 km || 
|-id=528 bgcolor=#fefefe
| 216528 ||  || — || July 23, 2001 || Palomar || NEAT || H || align=right data-sort-value="0.80" | 800 m || 
|-id=529 bgcolor=#E9E9E9
| 216529 ||  || — || July 29, 2001 || Haleakalā || NEAT || — || align=right | 1.9 km || 
|-id=530 bgcolor=#d6d6d6
| 216530 ||  || — || July 20, 2001 || Palomar || NEAT || SAN || align=right | 2.0 km || 
|-id=531 bgcolor=#E9E9E9
| 216531 ||  || — || August 22, 2001 || Socorro || LINEAR || — || align=right | 1.4 km || 
|-id=532 bgcolor=#E9E9E9
| 216532 ||  || — || August 22, 2001 || Socorro || LINEAR || — || align=right | 2.0 km || 
|-id=533 bgcolor=#E9E9E9
| 216533 ||  || — || August 22, 2001 || Socorro || LINEAR || EUN || align=right | 2.3 km || 
|-id=534 bgcolor=#E9E9E9
| 216534 ||  || — || August 24, 2001 || Anderson Mesa || LONEOS || — || align=right | 1.9 km || 
|-id=535 bgcolor=#E9E9E9
| 216535 ||  || — || August 25, 2001 || Socorro || LINEAR || — || align=right | 2.8 km || 
|-id=536 bgcolor=#E9E9E9
| 216536 ||  || — || August 19, 2001 || Socorro || LINEAR || — || align=right | 4.4 km || 
|-id=537 bgcolor=#E9E9E9
| 216537 ||  || — || August 16, 2001 || Palomar || NEAT || — || align=right | 2.2 km || 
|-id=538 bgcolor=#E9E9E9
| 216538 ||  || — || September 12, 2001 || Socorro || LINEAR || HEN || align=right | 1.9 km || 
|-id=539 bgcolor=#E9E9E9
| 216539 ||  || — || September 10, 2001 || Anderson Mesa || LONEOS || EUN || align=right | 1.5 km || 
|-id=540 bgcolor=#E9E9E9
| 216540 ||  || — || September 18, 2001 || Goodricke-Pigott || R. A. Tucker || ADE || align=right | 2.9 km || 
|-id=541 bgcolor=#E9E9E9
| 216541 ||  || — || September 16, 2001 || Socorro || LINEAR || EUN || align=right | 1.6 km || 
|-id=542 bgcolor=#E9E9E9
| 216542 ||  || — || September 16, 2001 || Socorro || LINEAR || EUN || align=right | 2.1 km || 
|-id=543 bgcolor=#fefefe
| 216543 ||  || — || September 20, 2001 || Socorro || LINEAR || — || align=right data-sort-value="0.87" | 870 m || 
|-id=544 bgcolor=#E9E9E9
| 216544 ||  || — || September 16, 2001 || Socorro || LINEAR || — || align=right | 1.2 km || 
|-id=545 bgcolor=#E9E9E9
| 216545 ||  || — || September 19, 2001 || Socorro || LINEAR || — || align=right | 3.0 km || 
|-id=546 bgcolor=#E9E9E9
| 216546 ||  || — || September 16, 2001 || Socorro || LINEAR || — || align=right | 2.4 km || 
|-id=547 bgcolor=#E9E9E9
| 216547 ||  || — || September 20, 2001 || Socorro || LINEAR || — || align=right | 3.2 km || 
|-id=548 bgcolor=#E9E9E9
| 216548 ||  || — || October 14, 2001 || Socorro || LINEAR || — || align=right | 3.4 km || 
|-id=549 bgcolor=#E9E9E9
| 216549 ||  || — || October 13, 2001 || Kitt Peak || Spacewatch || MRX || align=right | 1.2 km || 
|-id=550 bgcolor=#E9E9E9
| 216550 ||  || — || October 13, 2001 || Socorro || LINEAR || — || align=right | 4.8 km || 
|-id=551 bgcolor=#C2FFFF
| 216551 ||  || — || October 14, 2001 || Socorro || LINEAR || L5 || align=right | 10 km || 
|-id=552 bgcolor=#E9E9E9
| 216552 ||  || — || October 16, 2001 || Socorro || LINEAR || HOF || align=right | 3.4 km || 
|-id=553 bgcolor=#fefefe
| 216553 ||  || — || October 23, 2001 || Palomar || NEAT || — || align=right | 1.6 km || 
|-id=554 bgcolor=#E9E9E9
| 216554 ||  || — || October 18, 2001 || Palomar || NEAT || — || align=right | 3.6 km || 
|-id=555 bgcolor=#E9E9E9
| 216555 ||  || — || November 10, 2001 || Socorro || LINEAR || GEF || align=right | 2.0 km || 
|-id=556 bgcolor=#FA8072
| 216556 ||  || — || November 11, 2001 || Socorro || LINEAR || — || align=right data-sort-value="0.41" | 410 m || 
|-id=557 bgcolor=#E9E9E9
| 216557 ||  || — || November 9, 2001 || Socorro || LINEAR || — || align=right | 2.3 km || 
|-id=558 bgcolor=#E9E9E9
| 216558 ||  || — || November 9, 2001 || Socorro || LINEAR || — || align=right | 3.8 km || 
|-id=559 bgcolor=#E9E9E9
| 216559 ||  || — || November 11, 2001 || Socorro || LINEAR || — || align=right | 2.7 km || 
|-id=560 bgcolor=#d6d6d6
| 216560 ||  || — || November 19, 2001 || Anderson Mesa || LONEOS || URS || align=right | 6.5 km || 
|-id=561 bgcolor=#E9E9E9
| 216561 ||  || — || November 19, 2001 || Anderson Mesa || LONEOS || HEN || align=right | 1.7 km || 
|-id=562 bgcolor=#fefefe
| 216562 ||  || — || December 8, 2001 || Socorro || LINEAR || H || align=right | 1.1 km || 
|-id=563 bgcolor=#E9E9E9
| 216563 ||  || — || December 11, 2001 || Socorro || LINEAR || JUN || align=right | 2.8 km || 
|-id=564 bgcolor=#E9E9E9
| 216564 ||  || — || December 15, 2001 || Socorro || LINEAR || WIT || align=right | 1.5 km || 
|-id=565 bgcolor=#d6d6d6
| 216565 ||  || — || December 18, 2001 || Socorro || LINEAR || — || align=right | 3.8 km || 
|-id=566 bgcolor=#d6d6d6
| 216566 ||  || — || December 18, 2001 || Socorro || LINEAR || — || align=right | 5.8 km || 
|-id=567 bgcolor=#d6d6d6
| 216567 ||  || — || January 7, 2002 || Anderson Mesa || LONEOS || — || align=right | 5.1 km || 
|-id=568 bgcolor=#fefefe
| 216568 ||  || — || January 13, 2002 || Socorro || LINEAR || — || align=right | 1.2 km || 
|-id=569 bgcolor=#d6d6d6
| 216569 ||  || — || January 14, 2002 || Socorro || LINEAR || EOS || align=right | 3.4 km || 
|-id=570 bgcolor=#fefefe
| 216570 ||  || — || February 7, 2002 || Socorro || LINEAR || — || align=right | 1.2 km || 
|-id=571 bgcolor=#fefefe
| 216571 ||  || — || February 7, 2002 || Socorro || LINEAR || — || align=right data-sort-value="0.79" | 790 m || 
|-id=572 bgcolor=#d6d6d6
| 216572 ||  || — || February 8, 2002 || Socorro || LINEAR || ALA || align=right | 5.6 km || 
|-id=573 bgcolor=#d6d6d6
| 216573 ||  || — || February 3, 2002 || Cima Ekar || ADAS || — || align=right | 4.3 km || 
|-id=574 bgcolor=#E9E9E9
| 216574 ||  || — || February 6, 2002 || Anderson Mesa || LONEOS || — || align=right | 3.4 km || 
|-id=575 bgcolor=#fefefe
| 216575 ||  || — || February 7, 2002 || Palomar || NEAT || FLO || align=right data-sort-value="0.78" | 780 m || 
|-id=576 bgcolor=#d6d6d6
| 216576 ||  || — || February 19, 2002 || Socorro || LINEAR || — || align=right | 6.2 km || 
|-id=577 bgcolor=#fefefe
| 216577 ||  || — || February 20, 2002 || Socorro || LINEAR || NYS || align=right | 1.1 km || 
|-id=578 bgcolor=#fefefe
| 216578 ||  || — || March 13, 2002 || Palomar || NEAT || — || align=right | 1.0 km || 
|-id=579 bgcolor=#d6d6d6
| 216579 ||  || — || March 20, 2002 || Socorro || LINEAR || — || align=right | 6.7 km || 
|-id=580 bgcolor=#fefefe
| 216580 ||  || — || April 2, 2002 || Kitt Peak || Spacewatch || — || align=right | 1.1 km || 
|-id=581 bgcolor=#fefefe
| 216581 ||  || — || April 10, 2002 || Socorro || LINEAR || — || align=right | 1.3 km || 
|-id=582 bgcolor=#fefefe
| 216582 ||  || — || April 10, 2002 || Socorro || LINEAR || — || align=right | 1.1 km || 
|-id=583 bgcolor=#fefefe
| 216583 ||  || — || April 12, 2002 || Socorro || LINEAR || — || align=right | 1.4 km || 
|-id=584 bgcolor=#d6d6d6
| 216584 ||  || — || April 16, 2002 || Socorro || LINEAR || — || align=right | 6.2 km || 
|-id=585 bgcolor=#fefefe
| 216585 ||  || — || May 7, 2002 || Palomar || NEAT || FLO || align=right data-sort-value="0.94" | 940 m || 
|-id=586 bgcolor=#fefefe
| 216586 ||  || — || May 16, 2002 || Socorro || LINEAR || V || align=right data-sort-value="0.90" | 900 m || 
|-id=587 bgcolor=#fefefe
| 216587 ||  || — || June 8, 2002 || Socorro || LINEAR || — || align=right | 1.2 km || 
|-id=588 bgcolor=#fefefe
| 216588 ||  || — || June 6, 2002 || Socorro || LINEAR || FLO || align=right data-sort-value="0.89" | 890 m || 
|-id=589 bgcolor=#fefefe
| 216589 ||  || — || June 9, 2002 || Socorro || LINEAR || — || align=right | 1.4 km || 
|-id=590 bgcolor=#fefefe
| 216590 ||  || — || June 15, 2002 || Kingsnake || J. V. McClusky || — || align=right | 1.3 km || 
|-id=591 bgcolor=#fefefe
| 216591 Coetzee ||  ||  || July 21, 2002 || Campo Catino || G. Masi || — || align=right | 1.3 km || 
|-id=592 bgcolor=#fefefe
| 216592 ||  || — || July 22, 2002 || Palomar || NEAT || — || align=right data-sort-value="0.97" | 970 m || 
|-id=593 bgcolor=#fefefe
| 216593 ||  || — || July 18, 2002 || Socorro || LINEAR || — || align=right data-sort-value="0.98" | 980 m || 
|-id=594 bgcolor=#fefefe
| 216594 ||  || — || July 17, 2002 || Palomar || NEAT || — || align=right data-sort-value="0.98" | 980 m || 
|-id=595 bgcolor=#FA8072
| 216595 ||  || — || August 3, 2002 || Palomar || NEAT || — || align=right data-sort-value="0.84" | 840 m || 
|-id=596 bgcolor=#fefefe
| 216596 ||  || — || August 12, 2002 || Socorro || LINEAR || — || align=right | 1.1 km || 
|-id=597 bgcolor=#fefefe
| 216597 ||  || — || August 14, 2002 || Socorro || LINEAR || NYS || align=right data-sort-value="0.97" | 970 m || 
|-id=598 bgcolor=#fefefe
| 216598 ||  || — || August 15, 2002 || Socorro || LINEAR || NYS || align=right data-sort-value="0.92" | 920 m || 
|-id=599 bgcolor=#fefefe
| 216599 ||  || — || August 8, 2002 || Palomar || S. F. Hönig || — || align=right | 1.2 km || 
|-id=600 bgcolor=#fefefe
| 216600 ||  || — || August 26, 2002 || Palomar || NEAT || ERI || align=right | 2.0 km || 
|}

216601–216700 

|-bgcolor=#d6d6d6
| 216601 ||  || — || September 3, 2002 || Haleakalā || NEAT || — || align=right | 5.3 km || 
|-id=602 bgcolor=#fefefe
| 216602 ||  || — || September 4, 2002 || Anderson Mesa || LONEOS || — || align=right | 1.4 km || 
|-id=603 bgcolor=#d6d6d6
| 216603 ||  || — || September 5, 2002 || Socorro || LINEAR || — || align=right | 4.5 km || 
|-id=604 bgcolor=#fefefe
| 216604 ||  || — || October 1, 2002 || Anderson Mesa || LONEOS || NYS || align=right | 1.1 km || 
|-id=605 bgcolor=#fefefe
| 216605 ||  || — || October 1, 2002 || Haleakalā || NEAT || — || align=right | 1.2 km || 
|-id=606 bgcolor=#fefefe
| 216606 ||  || — || October 1, 2002 || Haleakalā || NEAT || — || align=right | 1.2 km || 
|-id=607 bgcolor=#E9E9E9
| 216607 ||  || — || October 4, 2002 || Anderson Mesa || LONEOS || — || align=right | 2.6 km || 
|-id=608 bgcolor=#fefefe
| 216608 ||  || — || October 1, 2002 || Haleakalā || NEAT || — || align=right | 1.7 km || 
|-id=609 bgcolor=#E9E9E9
| 216609 ||  || — || October 12, 2002 || Socorro || LINEAR || — || align=right | 3.1 km || 
|-id=610 bgcolor=#fefefe
| 216610 ||  || — || October 7, 2002 || Palomar || NEAT || — || align=right | 1.2 km || 
|-id=611 bgcolor=#fefefe
| 216611 ||  || — || October 7, 2002 || Socorro || LINEAR || V || align=right | 1.3 km || 
|-id=612 bgcolor=#fefefe
| 216612 ||  || — || October 9, 2002 || Socorro || LINEAR || LCI || align=right | 1.3 km || 
|-id=613 bgcolor=#d6d6d6
| 216613 ||  || — || October 10, 2002 || Socorro || LINEAR || HIL || align=right | 12 km || 
|-id=614 bgcolor=#fefefe
| 216614 ||  || — || October 5, 2002 || Palomar || NEAT || V || align=right data-sort-value="0.81" | 810 m || 
|-id=615 bgcolor=#d6d6d6
| 216615 ||  || — || October 30, 2002 || Socorro || LINEAR || HIL3:2 || align=right | 7.3 km || 
|-id=616 bgcolor=#E9E9E9
| 216616 ||  || — || November 1, 2002 || Palomar || NEAT || — || align=right | 1.7 km || 
|-id=617 bgcolor=#fefefe
| 216617 ||  || — || November 7, 2002 || Socorro || LINEAR || NYS || align=right data-sort-value="0.99" | 990 m || 
|-id=618 bgcolor=#E9E9E9
| 216618 ||  || — || November 7, 2002 || Socorro || LINEAR || — || align=right | 2.9 km || 
|-id=619 bgcolor=#E9E9E9
| 216619 ||  || — || November 14, 2002 || Socorro || LINEAR || — || align=right | 3.1 km || 
|-id=620 bgcolor=#E9E9E9
| 216620 ||  || — || November 5, 2002 || Socorro || LINEAR || — || align=right | 5.2 km || 
|-id=621 bgcolor=#E9E9E9
| 216621 ||  || — || November 8, 2002 || Socorro || LINEAR || — || align=right | 2.6 km || 
|-id=622 bgcolor=#fefefe
| 216622 ||  || — || November 24, 2002 || Palomar || NEAT || FLO || align=right data-sort-value="0.87" | 870 m || 
|-id=623 bgcolor=#E9E9E9
| 216623 ||  || — || November 23, 2002 || Palomar || NEAT || — || align=right | 1.1 km || 
|-id=624 bgcolor=#E9E9E9
| 216624 Kaufer ||  ||  || December 9, 2002 || Heppenheim || Starkenburg Obs. || — || align=right | 2.1 km || 
|-id=625 bgcolor=#fefefe
| 216625 ||  || — || December 11, 2002 || Socorro || LINEAR || — || align=right | 2.4 km || 
|-id=626 bgcolor=#E9E9E9
| 216626 ||  || — || December 31, 2002 || Socorro || LINEAR || NEM || align=right | 3.3 km || 
|-id=627 bgcolor=#E9E9E9
| 216627 ||  || — || December 31, 2002 || Socorro || LINEAR || — || align=right | 1.8 km || 
|-id=628 bgcolor=#E9E9E9
| 216628 ||  || — || December 31, 2002 || Socorro || LINEAR || — || align=right | 3.4 km || 
|-id=629 bgcolor=#E9E9E9
| 216629 ||  || — || January 2, 2003 || Socorro || LINEAR || — || align=right | 2.1 km || 
|-id=630 bgcolor=#E9E9E9
| 216630 ||  || — || January 7, 2003 || Socorro || LINEAR || — || align=right | 2.4 km || 
|-id=631 bgcolor=#E9E9E9
| 216631 ||  || — || January 25, 2003 || Palomar || NEAT || GAL || align=right | 2.4 km || 
|-id=632 bgcolor=#d6d6d6
| 216632 ||  || — || January 26, 2003 || Palomar || NEAT || — || align=right | 4.9 km || 
|-id=633 bgcolor=#fefefe
| 216633 ||  || — || January 27, 2003 || Haleakalā || NEAT || H || align=right data-sort-value="0.89" | 890 m || 
|-id=634 bgcolor=#d6d6d6
| 216634 ||  || — || March 8, 2003 || Socorro || LINEAR || TIR || align=right | 3.8 km || 
|-id=635 bgcolor=#d6d6d6
| 216635 ||  || — || March 24, 2003 || Socorro || LINEAR || EUP || align=right | 6.0 km || 
|-id=636 bgcolor=#d6d6d6
| 216636 ||  || — || March 30, 2003 || Socorro || LINEAR || — || align=right | 6.9 km || 
|-id=637 bgcolor=#d6d6d6
| 216637 ||  || — || March 23, 2003 || Apache Point || SDSS || — || align=right | 5.1 km || 
|-id=638 bgcolor=#d6d6d6
| 216638 ||  || — || April 1, 2003 || Socorro || LINEAR || TIR || align=right | 3.4 km || 
|-id=639 bgcolor=#FA8072
| 216639 ||  || — || April 7, 2003 || Kitt Peak || Spacewatch || — || align=right | 1.1 km || 
|-id=640 bgcolor=#d6d6d6
| 216640 ||  || — || April 6, 2003 || Anderson Mesa || LONEOS || TIR || align=right | 3.8 km || 
|-id=641 bgcolor=#d6d6d6
| 216641 ||  || — || April 8, 2003 || Palomar || NEAT || — || align=right | 3.9 km || 
|-id=642 bgcolor=#d6d6d6
| 216642 ||  || — || April 9, 2003 || Palomar || NEAT || — || align=right | 3.2 km || 
|-id=643 bgcolor=#d6d6d6
| 216643 ||  || — || May 26, 2003 || Haleakalā || NEAT || — || align=right | 4.7 km || 
|-id=644 bgcolor=#fefefe
| 216644 ||  || — || August 22, 2003 || Palomar || NEAT || — || align=right data-sort-value="0.96" | 960 m || 
|-id=645 bgcolor=#fefefe
| 216645 ||  || — || August 22, 2003 || Socorro || LINEAR || — || align=right | 1.3 km || 
|-id=646 bgcolor=#FA8072
| 216646 ||  || — || August 23, 2003 || Socorro || LINEAR || — || align=right | 1.0 km || 
|-id=647 bgcolor=#fefefe
| 216647 ||  || — || August 31, 2003 || Haleakalā || NEAT || FLO || align=right | 1.4 km || 
|-id=648 bgcolor=#E9E9E9
| 216648 ||  || — || September 26, 2003 || Socorro || LINEAR || — || align=right | 2.2 km || 
|-id=649 bgcolor=#E9E9E9
| 216649 ||  || — || September 26, 2003 || Socorro || LINEAR || EUN || align=right | 3.1 km || 
|-id=650 bgcolor=#fefefe
| 216650 ||  || — || October 14, 2003 || Anderson Mesa || LONEOS || FLO || align=right | 1.1 km || 
|-id=651 bgcolor=#fefefe
| 216651 ||  || — || October 3, 2003 || Kitt Peak || Spacewatch || — || align=right | 1.2 km || 
|-id=652 bgcolor=#FA8072
| 216652 ||  || — || October 16, 2003 || Kitt Peak || Spacewatch || — || align=right data-sort-value="0.90" | 900 m || 
|-id=653 bgcolor=#FA8072
| 216653 ||  || — || October 22, 2003 || Socorro || LINEAR || — || align=right | 1.1 km || 
|-id=654 bgcolor=#fefefe
| 216654 ||  || — || October 30, 2003 || Socorro || LINEAR || — || align=right | 1.1 km || 
|-id=655 bgcolor=#fefefe
| 216655 ||  || — || October 18, 2003 || Anderson Mesa || LONEOS || — || align=right | 1.1 km || 
|-id=656 bgcolor=#fefefe
| 216656 ||  || — || October 20, 2003 || Socorro || LINEAR || FLO || align=right data-sort-value="0.78" | 780 m || 
|-id=657 bgcolor=#fefefe
| 216657 ||  || — || October 21, 2003 || Socorro || LINEAR || V || align=right data-sort-value="0.92" | 920 m || 
|-id=658 bgcolor=#fefefe
| 216658 ||  || — || October 28, 2003 || Socorro || LINEAR || — || align=right data-sort-value="0.75" | 750 m || 
|-id=659 bgcolor=#fefefe
| 216659 ||  || — || October 21, 2003 || Kitt Peak || Spacewatch || V || align=right data-sort-value="0.97" | 970 m || 
|-id=660 bgcolor=#fefefe
| 216660 ||  || — || November 21, 2003 || Socorro || LINEAR || — || align=right | 1.2 km || 
|-id=661 bgcolor=#fefefe
| 216661 ||  || — || December 12, 2003 || Palomar || NEAT || — || align=right | 1.1 km || 
|-id=662 bgcolor=#fefefe
| 216662 ||  || — || December 14, 2003 || Palomar || NEAT || — || align=right | 1.3 km || 
|-id=663 bgcolor=#E9E9E9
| 216663 ||  || — || December 19, 2003 || Haleakalā || NEAT || — || align=right | 2.3 km || 
|-id=664 bgcolor=#E9E9E9
| 216664 ||  || — || December 18, 2003 || Socorro || LINEAR || — || align=right | 1.9 km || 
|-id=665 bgcolor=#E9E9E9
| 216665 ||  || — || December 19, 2003 || Socorro || LINEAR || HNS || align=right | 1.7 km || 
|-id=666 bgcolor=#E9E9E9
| 216666 ||  || — || January 15, 2004 || Kitt Peak || Spacewatch || — || align=right | 1.4 km || 
|-id=667 bgcolor=#E9E9E9
| 216667 ||  || — || January 18, 2004 || Palomar || NEAT || — || align=right | 1.5 km || 
|-id=668 bgcolor=#E9E9E9
| 216668 ||  || — || January 19, 2004 || Catalina || CSS || JUN || align=right | 1.6 km || 
|-id=669 bgcolor=#E9E9E9
| 216669 ||  || — || January 19, 2004 || Catalina || CSS || — || align=right | 2.1 km || 
|-id=670 bgcolor=#E9E9E9
| 216670 ||  || — || January 21, 2004 || Socorro || LINEAR || — || align=right | 3.4 km || 
|-id=671 bgcolor=#fefefe
| 216671 ||  || — || January 23, 2004 || Socorro || LINEAR || — || align=right | 1.7 km || 
|-id=672 bgcolor=#fefefe
| 216672 ||  || — || January 23, 2004 || Socorro || LINEAR || — || align=right | 1.2 km || 
|-id=673 bgcolor=#E9E9E9
| 216673 ||  || — || January 23, 2004 || Anderson Mesa || LONEOS || JUN || align=right | 1.2 km || 
|-id=674 bgcolor=#E9E9E9
| 216674 ||  || — || January 26, 2004 || Anderson Mesa || LONEOS || — || align=right | 1.6 km || 
|-id=675 bgcolor=#E9E9E9
| 216675 ||  || — || January 28, 2004 || Catalina || CSS || — || align=right | 3.7 km || 
|-id=676 bgcolor=#E9E9E9
| 216676 ||  || — || February 10, 2004 || Palomar || NEAT || — || align=right | 2.4 km || 
|-id=677 bgcolor=#E9E9E9
| 216677 ||  || — || February 16, 2004 || Kitt Peak || Spacewatch || — || align=right | 2.4 km || 
|-id=678 bgcolor=#E9E9E9
| 216678 ||  || — || February 19, 2004 || Socorro || LINEAR || EUN || align=right | 1.4 km || 
|-id=679 bgcolor=#E9E9E9
| 216679 ||  || — || February 19, 2004 || Socorro || LINEAR || — || align=right | 2.8 km || 
|-id=680 bgcolor=#E9E9E9
| 216680 ||  || — || March 12, 2004 || Palomar || NEAT || — || align=right | 4.0 km || 
|-id=681 bgcolor=#E9E9E9
| 216681 ||  || — || March 15, 2004 || Socorro || LINEAR || — || align=right | 2.9 km || 
|-id=682 bgcolor=#E9E9E9
| 216682 ||  || — || March 29, 2004 || Socorro || LINEAR || — || align=right | 2.2 km || 
|-id=683 bgcolor=#E9E9E9
| 216683 ||  || — || April 10, 2004 || Catalina || CSS || — || align=right | 3.2 km || 
|-id=684 bgcolor=#E9E9E9
| 216684 ||  || — || April 11, 2004 || Palomar || NEAT || DOR || align=right | 5.1 km || 
|-id=685 bgcolor=#E9E9E9
| 216685 ||  || — || April 12, 2004 || Kitt Peak || Spacewatch || NEM || align=right | 2.8 km || 
|-id=686 bgcolor=#E9E9E9
| 216686 ||  || — || April 14, 2004 || Kitt Peak || Spacewatch || HEN || align=right | 1.3 km || 
|-id=687 bgcolor=#E9E9E9
| 216687 ||  || — || April 15, 2004 || Anderson Mesa || LONEOS || ADE || align=right | 2.9 km || 
|-id=688 bgcolor=#E9E9E9
| 216688 ||  || — || April 13, 2004 || Catalina || CSS || GEF || align=right | 1.7 km || 
|-id=689 bgcolor=#FA8072
| 216689 ||  || — || April 19, 2004 || Socorro || LINEAR || unusual || align=right | 2.3 km || 
|-id=690 bgcolor=#E9E9E9
| 216690 ||  || — || April 19, 2004 || Socorro || LINEAR || DOR || align=right | 3.8 km || 
|-id=691 bgcolor=#d6d6d6
| 216691 ||  || — || April 21, 2004 || Socorro || LINEAR || — || align=right | 4.7 km || 
|-id=692 bgcolor=#E9E9E9
| 216692 ||  || — || April 23, 2004 || Haleakalā || NEAT || — || align=right | 4.7 km || 
|-id=693 bgcolor=#d6d6d6
| 216693 ||  || — || July 14, 2004 || Socorro || LINEAR || — || align=right | 4.7 km || 
|-id=694 bgcolor=#fefefe
| 216694 ||  || — || July 16, 2004 || Siding Spring || SSS || H || align=right data-sort-value="0.83" | 830 m || 
|-id=695 bgcolor=#fefefe
| 216695 ||  || — || August 21, 2004 || Goodricke-Pigott || R. A. Tucker || H || align=right data-sort-value="0.82" | 820 m || 
|-id=696 bgcolor=#d6d6d6
| 216696 ||  || — || August 22, 2004 || Reedy Creek || J. Broughton || EOS || align=right | 3.3 km || 
|-id=697 bgcolor=#d6d6d6
| 216697 ||  || — || August 19, 2004 || Socorro || LINEAR || — || align=right | 4.8 km || 
|-id=698 bgcolor=#d6d6d6
| 216698 ||  || — || September 8, 2004 || Palomar || NEAT || — || align=right | 7.2 km || 
|-id=699 bgcolor=#d6d6d6
| 216699 ||  || — || September 10, 2004 || Socorro || LINEAR || — || align=right | 5.3 km || 
|-id=700 bgcolor=#d6d6d6
| 216700 ||  || — || September 10, 2004 || Socorro || LINEAR || — || align=right | 3.5 km || 
|}

216701–216800 

|-bgcolor=#d6d6d6
| 216701 ||  || — || September 11, 2004 || Socorro || LINEAR || — || align=right | 5.2 km || 
|-id=702 bgcolor=#fefefe
| 216702 ||  || — || September 10, 2004 || Socorro || LINEAR || V || align=right | 1.0 km || 
|-id=703 bgcolor=#d6d6d6
| 216703 ||  || — || September 10, 2004 || Socorro || LINEAR || — || align=right | 3.7 km || 
|-id=704 bgcolor=#d6d6d6
| 216704 ||  || — || September 11, 2004 || Socorro || LINEAR || — || align=right | 6.3 km || 
|-id=705 bgcolor=#fefefe
| 216705 ||  || — || September 15, 2004 || Socorro || LINEAR || H || align=right data-sort-value="0.78" | 780 m || 
|-id=706 bgcolor=#d6d6d6
| 216706 ||  || — || October 10, 2004 || Socorro || LINEAR || — || align=right | 5.2 km || 
|-id=707 bgcolor=#FFC2E0
| 216707 ||  || — || December 12, 2004 || Catalina || CSS || AMO +1km || align=right | 1.1 km || 
|-id=708 bgcolor=#fefefe
| 216708 ||  || — || December 18, 2004 || Mount Lemmon || Mount Lemmon Survey || — || align=right data-sort-value="0.86" | 860 m || 
|-id=709 bgcolor=#fefefe
| 216709 ||  || — || January 15, 2005 || Socorro || LINEAR || — || align=right data-sort-value="0.87" | 870 m || 
|-id=710 bgcolor=#fefefe
| 216710 ||  || — || February 2, 2005 || Kitt Peak || Spacewatch || NYS || align=right data-sort-value="0.76" | 760 m || 
|-id=711 bgcolor=#fefefe
| 216711 ||  || — || February 2, 2005 || Kitt Peak || Spacewatch || NYS || align=right data-sort-value="0.75" | 750 m || 
|-id=712 bgcolor=#fefefe
| 216712 ||  || — || March 3, 2005 || Mayhill || A. Lowe || — || align=right | 1.1 km || 
|-id=713 bgcolor=#fefefe
| 216713 ||  || — || March 1, 2005 || Kitt Peak || Spacewatch || — || align=right | 1.1 km || 
|-id=714 bgcolor=#fefefe
| 216714 ||  || — || March 3, 2005 || Catalina || CSS || MAS || align=right data-sort-value="0.88" | 880 m || 
|-id=715 bgcolor=#fefefe
| 216715 ||  || — || March 2, 2005 || Catalina || CSS || — || align=right data-sort-value="0.90" | 900 m || 
|-id=716 bgcolor=#fefefe
| 216716 ||  || — || March 4, 2005 || Kitt Peak || Spacewatch || V || align=right data-sort-value="0.87" | 870 m || 
|-id=717 bgcolor=#fefefe
| 216717 ||  || — || March 4, 2005 || Socorro || LINEAR || — || align=right | 1.1 km || 
|-id=718 bgcolor=#fefefe
| 216718 ||  || — || March 8, 2005 || Mount Lemmon || Mount Lemmon Survey || V || align=right data-sort-value="0.84" | 840 m || 
|-id=719 bgcolor=#fefefe
| 216719 ||  || — || March 9, 2005 || Catalina || CSS || — || align=right | 1.1 km || 
|-id=720 bgcolor=#fefefe
| 216720 ||  || — || March 11, 2005 || Mount Lemmon || Mount Lemmon Survey || NYS || align=right data-sort-value="0.82" | 820 m || 
|-id=721 bgcolor=#d6d6d6
| 216721 ||  || — || March 12, 2005 || Kitt Peak || Spacewatch || — || align=right | 3.6 km || 
|-id=722 bgcolor=#FA8072
| 216722 ||  || — || March 1, 2005 || Catalina || CSS || PHO || align=right | 1.8 km || 
|-id=723 bgcolor=#fefefe
| 216723 ||  || — || April 1, 2005 || Goodricke-Pigott || V. Reddy || — || align=right | 1.2 km || 
|-id=724 bgcolor=#fefefe
| 216724 ||  || — || April 3, 2005 || Palomar || NEAT || — || align=right data-sort-value="0.92" | 920 m || 
|-id=725 bgcolor=#fefefe
| 216725 ||  || — || April 5, 2005 || Anderson Mesa || LONEOS || — || align=right | 1.0 km || 
|-id=726 bgcolor=#fefefe
| 216726 ||  || — || April 1, 2005 || Anderson Mesa || LONEOS || PHO || align=right | 2.2 km || 
|-id=727 bgcolor=#fefefe
| 216727 ||  || — || April 2, 2005 || Catalina || CSS || PHO || align=right | 1.8 km || 
|-id=728 bgcolor=#fefefe
| 216728 ||  || — || April 6, 2005 || Mount Lemmon || Mount Lemmon Survey || NYS || align=right data-sort-value="0.94" | 940 m || 
|-id=729 bgcolor=#E9E9E9
| 216729 ||  || — || April 11, 2005 || Kitt Peak || Spacewatch || — || align=right | 1.4 km || 
|-id=730 bgcolor=#fefefe
| 216730 ||  || — || April 6, 2005 || Mount Lemmon || Mount Lemmon Survey || MAS || align=right data-sort-value="0.98" | 980 m || 
|-id=731 bgcolor=#E9E9E9
| 216731 ||  || — || April 10, 2005 || Mount Lemmon || Mount Lemmon Survey || — || align=right | 2.2 km || 
|-id=732 bgcolor=#fefefe
| 216732 ||  || — || April 12, 2005 || Kitt Peak || Spacewatch || — || align=right | 1.4 km || 
|-id=733 bgcolor=#fefefe
| 216733 ||  || — || April 17, 2005 || Kitt Peak || Spacewatch || — || align=right | 1.1 km || 
|-id=734 bgcolor=#E9E9E9
| 216734 ||  || — || May 3, 2005 || Kitt Peak || Spacewatch || — || align=right | 1.1 km || 
|-id=735 bgcolor=#fefefe
| 216735 ||  || — || May 3, 2005 || Kitt Peak || Spacewatch || — || align=right data-sort-value="0.76" | 760 m || 
|-id=736 bgcolor=#E9E9E9
| 216736 ||  || — || May 4, 2005 || Kitt Peak || Spacewatch || — || align=right | 1.8 km || 
|-id=737 bgcolor=#E9E9E9
| 216737 ||  || — || May 8, 2005 || Kitt Peak || Spacewatch || — || align=right | 1.3 km || 
|-id=738 bgcolor=#fefefe
| 216738 ||  || — || May 11, 2005 || Mount Lemmon || Mount Lemmon Survey || — || align=right | 1.2 km || 
|-id=739 bgcolor=#fefefe
| 216739 ||  || — || May 12, 2005 || Socorro || LINEAR || — || align=right | 1.3 km || 
|-id=740 bgcolor=#fefefe
| 216740 ||  || — || May 4, 2005 || Mount Lemmon || Mount Lemmon Survey || NYS || align=right | 1.0 km || 
|-id=741 bgcolor=#E9E9E9
| 216741 ||  || — || May 30, 2005 || Catalina || CSS || BAR || align=right | 2.2 km || 
|-id=742 bgcolor=#E9E9E9
| 216742 ||  || — || June 3, 2005 || Catalina || CSS || — || align=right | 1.8 km || 
|-id=743 bgcolor=#E9E9E9
| 216743 ||  || — || June 13, 2005 || Kitt Peak || Spacewatch || — || align=right | 1.6 km || 
|-id=744 bgcolor=#E9E9E9
| 216744 ||  || — || June 25, 2005 || Palomar || NEAT || — || align=right | 2.7 km || 
|-id=745 bgcolor=#E9E9E9
| 216745 ||  || — || June 28, 2005 || Palomar || NEAT || JUN || align=right | 1.4 km || 
|-id=746 bgcolor=#E9E9E9
| 216746 ||  || — || July 1, 2005 || Kitt Peak || Spacewatch || — || align=right | 1.6 km || 
|-id=747 bgcolor=#E9E9E9
| 216747 ||  || — || July 3, 2005 || Mount Lemmon || Mount Lemmon Survey || — || align=right | 1.7 km || 
|-id=748 bgcolor=#E9E9E9
| 216748 ||  || — || July 4, 2005 || Palomar || NEAT || — || align=right | 1.7 km || 
|-id=749 bgcolor=#E9E9E9
| 216749 ||  || — || July 7, 2005 || Reedy Creek || J. Broughton || — || align=right | 3.4 km || 
|-id=750 bgcolor=#fefefe
| 216750 ||  || — || July 10, 2005 || Kitt Peak || Spacewatch || — || align=right | 1.5 km || 
|-id=751 bgcolor=#d6d6d6
| 216751 ||  || — || July 18, 2005 || Palomar || NEAT || — || align=right | 4.2 km || 
|-id=752 bgcolor=#d6d6d6
| 216752 ||  || — || August 10, 2005 || Cerro Tololo || M. W. Buie || — || align=right | 3.4 km || 
|-id=753 bgcolor=#E9E9E9
| 216753 ||  || — || August 22, 2005 || Palomar || NEAT || — || align=right | 2.1 km || 
|-id=754 bgcolor=#fefefe
| 216754 ||  || — || August 28, 2005 || Siding Spring || SSS || FLO || align=right data-sort-value="0.94" | 940 m || 
|-id=755 bgcolor=#d6d6d6
| 216755 ||  || — || August 29, 2005 || Anderson Mesa || LONEOS || CHA || align=right | 3.4 km || 
|-id=756 bgcolor=#d6d6d6
| 216756 ||  || — || August 28, 2005 || Kitt Peak || Spacewatch || — || align=right | 3.2 km || 
|-id=757 bgcolor=#d6d6d6
| 216757 Vasari ||  ||  || September 13, 2005 || Vallemare Borbona || V. S. Casulli || — || align=right | 4.2 km || 
|-id=758 bgcolor=#E9E9E9
| 216758 ||  || — || September 24, 2005 || Kitt Peak || Spacewatch || — || align=right | 2.9 km || 
|-id=759 bgcolor=#d6d6d6
| 216759 ||  || — || September 24, 2005 || Kitt Peak || Spacewatch || — || align=right | 3.9 km || 
|-id=760 bgcolor=#d6d6d6
| 216760 ||  || — || September 24, 2005 || Kitt Peak || Spacewatch || — || align=right | 2.9 km || 
|-id=761 bgcolor=#d6d6d6
| 216761 ||  || — || September 29, 2005 || Anderson Mesa || LONEOS || — || align=right | 4.5 km || 
|-id=762 bgcolor=#E9E9E9
| 216762 ||  || — || September 29, 2005 || Goodricke-Pigott || R. A. Tucker || — || align=right | 3.0 km || 
|-id=763 bgcolor=#d6d6d6
| 216763 ||  || — || September 27, 2005 || Kitt Peak || Spacewatch || — || align=right | 3.2 km || 
|-id=764 bgcolor=#E9E9E9
| 216764 ||  || — || October 7, 2005 || Catalina || CSS || DOR || align=right | 3.5 km || 
|-id=765 bgcolor=#d6d6d6
| 216765 ||  || — || October 7, 2005 || Catalina || CSS || — || align=right | 5.1 km || 
|-id=766 bgcolor=#d6d6d6
| 216766 ||  || — || October 23, 2005 || Palomar || NEAT || — || align=right | 5.5 km || 
|-id=767 bgcolor=#E9E9E9
| 216767 ||  || — || October 22, 2005 || Catalina || CSS || — || align=right | 3.4 km || 
|-id=768 bgcolor=#d6d6d6
| 216768 ||  || — || October 25, 2005 || Kitt Peak || Spacewatch || THM || align=right | 3.2 km || 
|-id=769 bgcolor=#d6d6d6
| 216769 ||  || — || October 26, 2005 || Socorro || LINEAR || EOS || align=right | 3.5 km || 
|-id=770 bgcolor=#d6d6d6
| 216770 ||  || — || November 3, 2005 || Socorro || LINEAR || — || align=right | 3.8 km || 
|-id=771 bgcolor=#d6d6d6
| 216771 ||  || — || November 22, 2005 || Kitt Peak || Spacewatch || 3:2 || align=right | 5.0 km || 
|-id=772 bgcolor=#d6d6d6
| 216772 ||  || — || November 25, 2005 || Kitt Peak || Spacewatch || HYG || align=right | 3.2 km || 
|-id=773 bgcolor=#FA8072
| 216773 ||  || — || January 17, 2006 || Palomar || NEAT || — || align=right | 1.4 km || 
|-id=774 bgcolor=#fefefe
| 216774 ||  || — || April 18, 2006 || Palomar || NEAT || — || align=right | 1.1 km || 
|-id=775 bgcolor=#d6d6d6
| 216775 ||  || — || April 21, 2006 || Kitt Peak || Spacewatch || VER || align=right | 7.2 km || 
|-id=776 bgcolor=#fefefe
| 216776 ||  || — || May 6, 2006 || Mount Lemmon || Mount Lemmon Survey || — || align=right data-sort-value="0.87" | 870 m || 
|-id=777 bgcolor=#fefefe
| 216777 ||  || — || August 17, 2006 || Socorro || LINEAR || MAS || align=right | 1.0 km || 
|-id=778 bgcolor=#E9E9E9
| 216778 ||  || — || August 18, 2006 || Anderson Mesa || LONEOS || — || align=right | 3.6 km || 
|-id=779 bgcolor=#fefefe
| 216779 ||  || — || August 19, 2006 || Palomar || NEAT || V || align=right data-sort-value="0.64" | 640 m || 
|-id=780 bgcolor=#fefefe
| 216780 Lilianne ||  ||  || August 27, 2006 || Wrightwood || J. W. Young || — || align=right data-sort-value="0.90" | 900 m || 
|-id=781 bgcolor=#fefefe
| 216781 ||  || — || August 23, 2006 || Socorro || LINEAR || — || align=right | 1.00 km || 
|-id=782 bgcolor=#fefefe
| 216782 ||  || — || August 27, 2006 || Anderson Mesa || LONEOS || V || align=right data-sort-value="0.92" | 920 m || 
|-id=783 bgcolor=#E9E9E9
| 216783 ||  || — || August 29, 2006 || Catalina || CSS || — || align=right | 3.3 km || 
|-id=784 bgcolor=#fefefe
| 216784 ||  || — || August 19, 2006 || Kitt Peak || Spacewatch || NYS || align=right data-sort-value="0.82" | 820 m || 
|-id=785 bgcolor=#fefefe
| 216785 ||  || — || September 14, 2006 || Palomar || NEAT || V || align=right data-sort-value="0.89" | 890 m || 
|-id=786 bgcolor=#fefefe
| 216786 ||  || — || September 14, 2006 || Kitt Peak || Spacewatch || — || align=right | 1.2 km || 
|-id=787 bgcolor=#E9E9E9
| 216787 ||  || — || September 14, 2006 || Kitt Peak || Spacewatch || HEN || align=right | 1.4 km || 
|-id=788 bgcolor=#E9E9E9
| 216788 ||  || — || September 15, 2006 || Kitt Peak || Spacewatch || — || align=right | 2.0 km || 
|-id=789 bgcolor=#fefefe
| 216789 ||  || — || September 16, 2006 || Kitt Peak || Spacewatch || — || align=right | 1.8 km || 
|-id=790 bgcolor=#E9E9E9
| 216790 ||  || — || September 17, 2006 || Catalina || CSS || — || align=right | 2.9 km || 
|-id=791 bgcolor=#fefefe
| 216791 ||  || — || September 17, 2006 || Kitt Peak || Spacewatch || V || align=right data-sort-value="0.99" | 990 m || 
|-id=792 bgcolor=#fefefe
| 216792 ||  || — || September 17, 2006 || Catalina || CSS || FLO || align=right data-sort-value="0.87" | 870 m || 
|-id=793 bgcolor=#E9E9E9
| 216793 ||  || — || September 17, 2006 || Anderson Mesa || LONEOS || — || align=right | 2.1 km || 
|-id=794 bgcolor=#E9E9E9
| 216794 ||  || — || September 18, 2006 || Catalina || CSS || — || align=right | 2.3 km || 
|-id=795 bgcolor=#E9E9E9
| 216795 ||  || — || September 19, 2006 || La Sagra || OAM Obs. || HEN || align=right | 1.6 km || 
|-id=796 bgcolor=#fefefe
| 216796 ||  || — || September 18, 2006 || Kitt Peak || Spacewatch || NYS || align=right data-sort-value="0.74" | 740 m || 
|-id=797 bgcolor=#E9E9E9
| 216797 ||  || — || September 20, 2006 || Palomar || NEAT || GEF || align=right | 1.5 km || 
|-id=798 bgcolor=#E9E9E9
| 216798 ||  || — || September 27, 2006 || La Sagra || OAM Obs. || — || align=right | 1.5 km || 
|-id=799 bgcolor=#E9E9E9
| 216799 ||  || — || September 28, 2006 || La Sagra || OAM Obs. || — || align=right | 1.9 km || 
|-id=800 bgcolor=#fefefe
| 216800 ||  || — || September 27, 2006 || Socorro || LINEAR || — || align=right data-sort-value="0.97" | 970 m || 
|}

216801–216900 

|-bgcolor=#fefefe
| 216801 ||  || — || September 27, 2006 || Kitt Peak || Spacewatch || MAS || align=right data-sort-value="0.82" | 820 m || 
|-id=802 bgcolor=#E9E9E9
| 216802 ||  || — || September 30, 2006 || Catalina || CSS || — || align=right | 2.5 km || 
|-id=803 bgcolor=#E9E9E9
| 216803 ||  || — || September 18, 2006 || Apache Point || A. C. Becker || EUN || align=right | 2.8 km || 
|-id=804 bgcolor=#d6d6d6
| 216804 ||  || — || September 27, 2006 || Apache Point || A. C. Becker || — || align=right | 3.9 km || 
|-id=805 bgcolor=#d6d6d6
| 216805 ||  || — || September 30, 2006 || Apache Point || A. C. Becker || — || align=right | 4.1 km || 
|-id=806 bgcolor=#E9E9E9
| 216806 ||  || — || September 30, 2006 || Apache Point || A. C. Becker || MAR || align=right | 1.5 km || 
|-id=807 bgcolor=#E9E9E9
| 216807 ||  || — || September 19, 2006 || Catalina || CSS || — || align=right | 2.2 km || 
|-id=808 bgcolor=#fefefe
| 216808 ||  || — || October 14, 2006 || Piszkéstető || K. Sárneczky, Z. Kuli || MAS || align=right data-sort-value="0.75" | 750 m || 
|-id=809 bgcolor=#E9E9E9
| 216809 ||  || — || October 12, 2006 || Kitt Peak || Spacewatch || — || align=right | 1.3 km || 
|-id=810 bgcolor=#E9E9E9
| 216810 ||  || — || October 12, 2006 || Palomar || NEAT || HOF || align=right | 4.6 km || 
|-id=811 bgcolor=#d6d6d6
| 216811 ||  || — || October 11, 2006 || Palomar || NEAT || — || align=right | 5.1 km || 
|-id=812 bgcolor=#d6d6d6
| 216812 ||  || — || October 3, 2006 || Apache Point || A. C. Becker || EOS || align=right | 1.8 km || 
|-id=813 bgcolor=#d6d6d6
| 216813 ||  || — || October 17, 2006 || Mount Lemmon || Mount Lemmon Survey || — || align=right | 3.8 km || 
|-id=814 bgcolor=#fefefe
| 216814 ||  || — || October 16, 2006 || Catalina || CSS || — || align=right | 3.1 km || 
|-id=815 bgcolor=#E9E9E9
| 216815 ||  || — || October 17, 2006 || Mount Lemmon || Mount Lemmon Survey || HEN || align=right | 1.5 km || 
|-id=816 bgcolor=#E9E9E9
| 216816 ||  || — || October 17, 2006 || Mount Lemmon || Mount Lemmon Survey || — || align=right | 3.3 km || 
|-id=817 bgcolor=#E9E9E9
| 216817 ||  || — || October 18, 2006 || Kitt Peak || Spacewatch || HEN || align=right | 1.2 km || 
|-id=818 bgcolor=#E9E9E9
| 216818 ||  || — || October 21, 2006 || Palomar || NEAT || — || align=right | 2.1 km || 
|-id=819 bgcolor=#E9E9E9
| 216819 ||  || — || October 27, 2006 || Mount Lemmon || Mount Lemmon Survey || — || align=right | 1.9 km || 
|-id=820 bgcolor=#d6d6d6
| 216820 ||  || — || October 27, 2006 || Kitt Peak || Spacewatch || KOR || align=right | 1.8 km || 
|-id=821 bgcolor=#d6d6d6
| 216821 ||  || — || October 28, 2006 || Mount Lemmon || Mount Lemmon Survey || — || align=right | 2.7 km || 
|-id=822 bgcolor=#d6d6d6
| 216822 ||  || — || November 10, 2006 || Kitt Peak || Spacewatch || — || align=right | 3.1 km || 
|-id=823 bgcolor=#d6d6d6
| 216823 ||  || — || November 11, 2006 || Kitt Peak || Spacewatch || EOS || align=right | 2.2 km || 
|-id=824 bgcolor=#d6d6d6
| 216824 ||  || — || November 11, 2006 || Kitt Peak || Spacewatch || EOS || align=right | 4.2 km || 
|-id=825 bgcolor=#d6d6d6
| 216825 ||  || — || November 11, 2006 || Kitt Peak || Spacewatch || — || align=right | 4.2 km || 
|-id=826 bgcolor=#E9E9E9
| 216826 ||  || — || November 11, 2006 || Kitt Peak || Spacewatch || — || align=right | 1.5 km || 
|-id=827 bgcolor=#d6d6d6
| 216827 ||  || — || November 11, 2006 || Mount Lemmon || Mount Lemmon Survey || THM || align=right | 2.5 km || 
|-id=828 bgcolor=#E9E9E9
| 216828 ||  || — || November 11, 2006 || Catalina || CSS || AGN || align=right | 4.3 km || 
|-id=829 bgcolor=#E9E9E9
| 216829 ||  || — || November 15, 2006 || Kitt Peak || Spacewatch || — || align=right | 1.9 km || 
|-id=830 bgcolor=#E9E9E9
| 216830 ||  || — || November 15, 2006 || Catalina || CSS || — || align=right | 1.7 km || 
|-id=831 bgcolor=#fefefe
| 216831 ||  || — || November 15, 2006 || Kitt Peak || Spacewatch || EUT || align=right data-sort-value="0.87" | 870 m || 
|-id=832 bgcolor=#E9E9E9
| 216832 ||  || — || November 15, 2006 || Catalina || CSS || EUN || align=right | 2.3 km || 
|-id=833 bgcolor=#E9E9E9
| 216833 ||  || — || November 9, 2006 || Palomar || NEAT || — || align=right | 1.5 km || 
|-id=834 bgcolor=#d6d6d6
| 216834 ||  || — || November 18, 2006 || Kitt Peak || Spacewatch || — || align=right | 3.9 km || 
|-id=835 bgcolor=#fefefe
| 216835 ||  || — || November 16, 2006 || Mount Lemmon || Mount Lemmon Survey || — || align=right data-sort-value="0.96" | 960 m || 
|-id=836 bgcolor=#d6d6d6
| 216836 ||  || — || November 16, 2006 || Kitt Peak || Spacewatch || — || align=right | 2.7 km || 
|-id=837 bgcolor=#d6d6d6
| 216837 ||  || — || November 19, 2006 || Kitt Peak || Spacewatch || — || align=right | 4.8 km || 
|-id=838 bgcolor=#d6d6d6
| 216838 ||  || — || November 19, 2006 || Kitt Peak || Spacewatch || — || align=right | 3.4 km || 
|-id=839 bgcolor=#fefefe
| 216839 ||  || — || November 25, 2006 || Kitt Peak || Spacewatch || — || align=right | 1.6 km || 
|-id=840 bgcolor=#d6d6d6
| 216840 ||  || — || November 17, 2006 || Kitt Peak || Spacewatch || — || align=right | 4.3 km || 
|-id=841 bgcolor=#E9E9E9
| 216841 ||  || — || December 12, 2006 || Kitt Peak || Spacewatch || — || align=right | 1.8 km || 
|-id=842 bgcolor=#d6d6d6
| 216842 ||  || — || December 11, 2006 || Kitt Peak || Spacewatch || — || align=right | 5.3 km || 
|-id=843 bgcolor=#E9E9E9
| 216843 ||  || — || December 14, 2006 || Mount Lemmon || Mount Lemmon Survey || — || align=right | 3.1 km || 
|-id=844 bgcolor=#E9E9E9
| 216844 ||  || — || December 12, 2006 || Palomar || NEAT || — || align=right | 4.4 km || 
|-id=845 bgcolor=#E9E9E9
| 216845 ||  || — || December 17, 2006 || Mount Lemmon || Mount Lemmon Survey || PAD || align=right | 2.1 km || 
|-id=846 bgcolor=#d6d6d6
| 216846 ||  || — || December 20, 2006 || Palomar || NEAT || — || align=right | 4.7 km || 
|-id=847 bgcolor=#C2FFFF
| 216847 ||  || — || March 8, 2007 || Palomar || NEAT || L5 || align=right | 14 km || 
|-id=848 bgcolor=#fefefe
| 216848 ||  || — || October 4, 2007 || Kitt Peak || Spacewatch || V || align=right | 1.1 km || 
|-id=849 bgcolor=#fefefe
| 216849 ||  || — || October 8, 2007 || Kitt Peak || Spacewatch || — || align=right | 1.3 km || 
|-id=850 bgcolor=#d6d6d6
| 216850 ||  || — || October 24, 2007 || Mount Lemmon || Mount Lemmon Survey || — || align=right | 3.6 km || 
|-id=851 bgcolor=#fefefe
| 216851 ||  || — || November 5, 2007 || Kitt Peak || Spacewatch || V || align=right | 1.0 km || 
|-id=852 bgcolor=#E9E9E9
| 216852 ||  || — || November 13, 2007 || Catalina || CSS || — || align=right | 2.5 km || 
|-id=853 bgcolor=#fefefe
| 216853 ||  || — || November 19, 2007 || Kitt Peak || Spacewatch || — || align=right | 1.1 km || 
|-id=854 bgcolor=#fefefe
| 216854 ||  || — || December 5, 2007 || Mount Lemmon || Mount Lemmon Survey || H || align=right | 1.0 km || 
|-id=855 bgcolor=#E9E9E9
| 216855 ||  || — || December 16, 2007 || Mount Lemmon || Mount Lemmon Survey || GAL || align=right | 2.1 km || 
|-id=856 bgcolor=#d6d6d6
| 216856 ||  || — || December 30, 2007 || Mount Lemmon || Mount Lemmon Survey || — || align=right | 4.3 km || 
|-id=857 bgcolor=#fefefe
| 216857 ||  || — || January 10, 2008 || Mount Lemmon || Mount Lemmon Survey || — || align=right | 1.1 km || 
|-id=858 bgcolor=#E9E9E9
| 216858 ||  || — || January 13, 2008 || Kitt Peak || Spacewatch || — || align=right | 1.2 km || 
|-id=859 bgcolor=#d6d6d6
| 216859 ||  || — || January 7, 2008 || La Sagra || OAM Obs. || — || align=right | 3.8 km || 
|-id=860 bgcolor=#d6d6d6
| 216860 ||  || — || January 29, 2008 || La Sagra || OAM Obs. || — || align=right | 4.2 km || 
|-id=861 bgcolor=#d6d6d6
| 216861 ||  || — || January 30, 2008 || Mount Lemmon || Mount Lemmon Survey || — || align=right | 3.5 km || 
|-id=862 bgcolor=#fefefe
| 216862 ||  || — || January 30, 2008 || Kitt Peak || Spacewatch || — || align=right | 1.7 km || 
|-id=863 bgcolor=#d6d6d6
| 216863 ||  || — || January 30, 2008 || Catalina || CSS || — || align=right | 3.3 km || 
|-id=864 bgcolor=#E9E9E9
| 216864 ||  || — || January 30, 2008 || Catalina || CSS || MAR || align=right | 1.7 km || 
|-id=865 bgcolor=#E9E9E9
| 216865 ||  || — || January 30, 2008 || Mount Lemmon || Mount Lemmon Survey || — || align=right | 1.7 km || 
|-id=866 bgcolor=#E9E9E9
| 216866 ||  || — || February 12, 2008 || Mount Lemmon || Mount Lemmon Survey || — || align=right | 2.0 km || 
|-id=867 bgcolor=#d6d6d6
| 216867 ||  || — || February 9, 2008 || Kitt Peak || Spacewatch || — || align=right | 3.2 km || 
|-id=868 bgcolor=#E9E9E9
| 216868 ||  || — || February 26, 2008 || Kitt Peak || Spacewatch || PAD || align=right | 2.3 km || 
|-id=869 bgcolor=#d6d6d6
| 216869 ||  || — || February 28, 2008 || Mount Lemmon || Mount Lemmon Survey || — || align=right | 3.4 km || 
|-id=870 bgcolor=#E9E9E9
| 216870 ||  || — || February 28, 2008 || Kitt Peak || Spacewatch || — || align=right | 3.0 km || 
|-id=871 bgcolor=#d6d6d6
| 216871 ||  || — || February 29, 2008 || Kitt Peak || Spacewatch || — || align=right | 3.1 km || 
|-id=872 bgcolor=#d6d6d6
| 216872 ||  || — || February 26, 2008 || Mount Lemmon || Mount Lemmon Survey || — || align=right | 4.2 km || 
|-id=873 bgcolor=#E9E9E9
| 216873 ||  || — || February 18, 2008 || Mount Lemmon || Mount Lemmon Survey || — || align=right | 2.4 km || 
|-id=874 bgcolor=#E9E9E9
| 216874 ||  || — || March 2, 2008 || Mount Lemmon || Mount Lemmon Survey || — || align=right | 3.0 km || 
|-id=875 bgcolor=#d6d6d6
| 216875 ||  || — || March 4, 2008 || Kitt Peak || Spacewatch || — || align=right | 5.5 km || 
|-id=876 bgcolor=#C2FFFF
| 216876 ||  || — || March 6, 2008 || Kitt Peak || Spacewatch || L5 || align=right | 12 km || 
|-id=877 bgcolor=#C2FFFF
| 216877 ||  || — || March 28, 2008 || Mount Lemmon || Mount Lemmon Survey || L5 || align=right | 8.9 km || 
|-id=878 bgcolor=#d6d6d6
| 216878 ||  || — || March 29, 2008 || Catalina || CSS || — || align=right | 4.3 km || 
|-id=879 bgcolor=#d6d6d6
| 216879 ||  || — || March 27, 2008 || Kitt Peak || Spacewatch || — || align=right | 3.7 km || 
|-id=880 bgcolor=#d6d6d6
| 216880 ||  || — || March 31, 2008 || Mount Lemmon || Mount Lemmon Survey || — || align=right | 3.8 km || 
|-id=881 bgcolor=#C2FFFF
| 216881 ||  || — || April 3, 2008 || Kitt Peak || Spacewatch || L5 || align=right | 11 km || 
|-id=882 bgcolor=#d6d6d6
| 216882 || 2008 KE || — || May 26, 2008 || Junk Bond || D. Healy || — || align=right | 3.7 km || 
|-id=883 bgcolor=#C2FFFF
| 216883 ||  || — || August 21, 2008 || Kitt Peak || Spacewatch || L4 || align=right | 13 km || 
|-id=884 bgcolor=#E9E9E9
| 216884 ||  || — || September 22, 2008 || Socorro || LINEAR || — || align=right | 2.1 km || 
|-id=885 bgcolor=#d6d6d6
| 216885 ||  || — || September 24, 2008 || Kitt Peak || Spacewatch || — || align=right | 3.7 km || 
|-id=886 bgcolor=#d6d6d6
| 216886 ||  || — || October 20, 2008 || Kitt Peak || Spacewatch || HYG || align=right | 4.1 km || 
|-id=887 bgcolor=#E9E9E9
| 216887 ||  || — || October 22, 2008 || Mount Lemmon || Mount Lemmon Survey || INO || align=right | 1.7 km || 
|-id=888 bgcolor=#E9E9E9
| 216888 Sankovich ||  ||  || November 2, 2008 || Zelenchukskaya || T. V. Kryachko || — || align=right | 3.0 km || 
|-id=889 bgcolor=#d6d6d6
| 216889 ||  || — || December 21, 2008 || Mount Lemmon || Mount Lemmon Survey || — || align=right | 2.4 km || 
|-id=890 bgcolor=#E9E9E9
| 216890 ||  || — || December 29, 2008 || Kitt Peak || Spacewatch || GEF || align=right | 2.0 km || 
|-id=891 bgcolor=#C2FFFF
| 216891 ||  || — || February 27, 2009 || Kitt Peak || Spacewatch || L5 || align=right | 12 km || 
|-id=892 bgcolor=#fefefe
| 216892 ||  || — || February 24, 2009 || Kitt Peak || Spacewatch || — || align=right | 1.6 km || 
|-id=893 bgcolor=#E9E9E9
| 216893 Navina ||  ||  || February 28, 2009 || Wildberg || R. Apitzsch || — || align=right | 2.4 km || 
|-id=894 bgcolor=#E9E9E9
| 216894 ||  || — || March 17, 2009 || La Sagra || OAM Obs. || — || align=right | 2.8 km || 
|-id=895 bgcolor=#E9E9E9
| 216895 ||  || — || April 18, 2009 || Catalina || CSS || — || align=right | 2.3 km || 
|-id=896 bgcolor=#E9E9E9
| 216896 ||  || — || April 20, 2009 || Kitt Peak || Spacewatch || — || align=right | 3.2 km || 
|-id=897 bgcolor=#d6d6d6
| 216897 Golubev ||  ||  || April 24, 2009 || Vitebsk || V. Nevski || EOS || align=right | 3.2 km || 
|-id=898 bgcolor=#C2FFFF
| 216898 ||  || — || April 27, 2009 || Kitt Peak || Spacewatch || L5 || align=right | 13 km || 
|-id=899 bgcolor=#E9E9E9
| 216899 ||  || — || April 27, 2009 || Kitt Peak || Spacewatch || GEF || align=right | 1.6 km || 
|-id=900 bgcolor=#d6d6d6
| 216900 ||  || — || April 27, 2009 || Kitt Peak || Spacewatch || — || align=right | 4.0 km || 
|}

216901–217000 

|-bgcolor=#fefefe
| 216901 ||  || — || April 23, 2009 || La Sagra || OAM Obs. || — || align=right | 1.0 km || 
|-id=902 bgcolor=#fefefe
| 216902 ||  || — || April 29, 2009 || Kitt Peak || Spacewatch || — || align=right | 1.0 km || 
|-id=903 bgcolor=#E9E9E9
| 216903 ||  || — || April 28, 2009 || Cerro Burek || Alianza S4 Obs. || — || align=right | 1.8 km || 
|-id=904 bgcolor=#fefefe
| 216904 ||  || — || April 16, 2009 || Catalina || CSS || MAS || align=right | 1.0 km || 
|-id=905 bgcolor=#d6d6d6
| 216905 ||  || — || April 18, 2009 || Kitt Peak || Spacewatch || THM || align=right | 4.5 km || 
|-id=906 bgcolor=#d6d6d6
| 216906 ||  || — || April 30, 2009 || Kitt Peak || Spacewatch || — || align=right | 4.0 km || 
|-id=907 bgcolor=#E9E9E9
| 216907 || 2009 JG || — || May 2, 2009 || La Sagra || OAM Obs. || MAR || align=right | 2.5 km || 
|-id=908 bgcolor=#E9E9E9
| 216908 || 2009 JQ || — || May 3, 2009 || La Sagra || OAM Obs. || — || align=right | 2.2 km || 
|-id=909 bgcolor=#E9E9E9
| 216909 ||  || — || May 4, 2009 || La Sagra || OAM Obs. || EUN || align=right | 2.0 km || 
|-id=910 bgcolor=#E9E9E9
| 216910 Vnukov ||  ||  || May 13, 2009 || Andrushivka || Andrushivka Obs. || — || align=right | 4.8 km || 
|-id=911 bgcolor=#fefefe
| 216911 ||  || — || May 24, 2009 || Mayhill || A. Lowe || — || align=right | 1.1 km || 
|-id=912 bgcolor=#fefefe
| 216912 ||  || — || May 22, 2009 || Cerro Burek || Alianza S4 Obs. || V || align=right data-sort-value="0.56" | 560 m || 
|-id=913 bgcolor=#E9E9E9
| 216913 || 4533 P-L || — || September 24, 1960 || Palomar || PLS || — || align=right | 1.8 km || 
|-id=914 bgcolor=#fefefe
| 216914 || 1084 T-2 || — || September 29, 1973 || Palomar || PLS || NYS || align=right data-sort-value="0.90" | 900 m || 
|-id=915 bgcolor=#E9E9E9
| 216915 || 1194 T-2 || — || September 29, 1973 || Palomar || PLS || — || align=right | 2.3 km || 
|-id=916 bgcolor=#E9E9E9
| 216916 || 1159 T-3 || — || October 17, 1977 || Palomar || PLS || — || align=right | 4.9 km || 
|-id=917 bgcolor=#FA8072
| 216917 ||  || — || October 14, 1990 || Kitt Peak || Spacewatch || — || align=right data-sort-value="0.93" | 930 m || 
|-id=918 bgcolor=#fefefe
| 216918 ||  || — || October 19, 1995 || Kitt Peak || Spacewatch || — || align=right | 1.5 km || 
|-id=919 bgcolor=#d6d6d6
| 216919 ||  || — || January 13, 1996 || Kitt Peak || Spacewatch || — || align=right | 6.7 km || 
|-id=920 bgcolor=#d6d6d6
| 216920 ||  || — || April 13, 1996 || Kitt Peak || Spacewatch || HYG || align=right | 3.3 km || 
|-id=921 bgcolor=#fefefe
| 216921 ||  || — || November 9, 1996 || Modra || P. Kolény, L. Kornoš || — || align=right | 1.6 km || 
|-id=922 bgcolor=#d6d6d6
| 216922 ||  || — || June 29, 1997 || Kitt Peak || Spacewatch || — || align=right | 3.9 km || 
|-id=923 bgcolor=#fefefe
| 216923 ||  || — || February 23, 1998 || Kitt Peak || Spacewatch || FLO || align=right data-sort-value="0.76" | 760 m || 
|-id=924 bgcolor=#fefefe
| 216924 ||  || — || August 26, 1998 || Woomera || F. B. Zoltowski || CLA || align=right | 2.2 km || 
|-id=925 bgcolor=#d6d6d6
| 216925 ||  || — || August 24, 1998 || Socorro || LINEAR || — || align=right | 5.5 km || 
|-id=926 bgcolor=#fefefe
| 216926 ||  || — || August 24, 1998 || Socorro || LINEAR || — || align=right | 1.7 km || 
|-id=927 bgcolor=#fefefe
| 216927 ||  || — || August 24, 1998 || Socorro || LINEAR || — || align=right | 1.5 km || 
|-id=928 bgcolor=#d6d6d6
| 216928 ||  || — || August 28, 1998 || Socorro || LINEAR || — || align=right | 6.4 km || 
|-id=929 bgcolor=#fefefe
| 216929 ||  || — || August 26, 1998 || La Silla || E. W. Elst || NYS || align=right data-sort-value="0.94" | 940 m || 
|-id=930 bgcolor=#fefefe
| 216930 ||  || — || September 19, 1998 || Socorro || LINEAR || — || align=right | 1.2 km || 
|-id=931 bgcolor=#fefefe
| 216931 ||  || — || October 23, 1998 || Višnjan Observatory || K. Korlević || — || align=right | 1.7 km || 
|-id=932 bgcolor=#fefefe
| 216932 ||  || — || November 10, 1998 || Caussols || ODAS || MAS || align=right | 1.3 km || 
|-id=933 bgcolor=#E9E9E9
| 216933 ||  || — || December 26, 1998 || Kitt Peak || Spacewatch || — || align=right | 4.7 km || 
|-id=934 bgcolor=#d6d6d6
| 216934 ||  || — || May 16, 1999 || Catalina || CSS || — || align=right | 5.2 km || 
|-id=935 bgcolor=#fefefe
| 216935 ||  || — || September 13, 1999 || Eskridge || G. Bell, G. Hug || — || align=right | 1.2 km || 
|-id=936 bgcolor=#fefefe
| 216936 ||  || — || September 9, 1999 || Socorro || LINEAR || — || align=right | 1.1 km || 
|-id=937 bgcolor=#fefefe
| 216937 ||  || — || September 9, 1999 || Socorro || LINEAR || FLO || align=right | 1.0 km || 
|-id=938 bgcolor=#d6d6d6
| 216938 ||  || — || September 8, 1999 || Socorro || LINEAR || — || align=right | 4.5 km || 
|-id=939 bgcolor=#fefefe
| 216939 ||  || — || September 30, 1999 || Kitt Peak || Spacewatch || — || align=right | 1.1 km || 
|-id=940 bgcolor=#d6d6d6
| 216940 ||  || — || October 13, 1999 || Ondřejov || P. Kušnirák, P. Pravec || — || align=right | 4.8 km || 
|-id=941 bgcolor=#fefefe
| 216941 ||  || — || October 7, 1999 || Goodricke-Pigott || R. A. Tucker || — || align=right | 1.0 km || 
|-id=942 bgcolor=#d6d6d6
| 216942 ||  || — || October 6, 1999 || Kitt Peak || Spacewatch || — || align=right | 4.5 km || 
|-id=943 bgcolor=#d6d6d6
| 216943 ||  || — || October 7, 1999 || Kitt Peak || Spacewatch || — || align=right | 3.1 km || 
|-id=944 bgcolor=#fefefe
| 216944 ||  || — || October 7, 1999 || Kitt Peak || Spacewatch || FLO || align=right data-sort-value="0.67" | 670 m || 
|-id=945 bgcolor=#d6d6d6
| 216945 ||  || — || October 4, 1999 || Socorro || LINEAR || — || align=right | 4.7 km || 
|-id=946 bgcolor=#fefefe
| 216946 ||  || — || October 3, 1999 || Catalina || CSS || — || align=right data-sort-value="0.87" | 870 m || 
|-id=947 bgcolor=#FA8072
| 216947 ||  || — || October 9, 1999 || Socorro || LINEAR || — || align=right data-sort-value="0.98" | 980 m || 
|-id=948 bgcolor=#d6d6d6
| 216948 ||  || — || October 14, 1999 || Socorro || LINEAR || — || align=right | 5.9 km || 
|-id=949 bgcolor=#E9E9E9
| 216949 ||  || — || October 19, 1999 || Socorro || LINEAR || — || align=right | 3.6 km || 
|-id=950 bgcolor=#fefefe
| 216950 ||  || — || November 3, 1999 || Socorro || LINEAR || — || align=right | 1.3 km || 
|-id=951 bgcolor=#d6d6d6
| 216951 ||  || — || November 9, 1999 || Socorro || LINEAR || — || align=right | 3.2 km || 
|-id=952 bgcolor=#d6d6d6
| 216952 ||  || — || November 9, 1999 || Socorro || LINEAR || EOS || align=right | 3.1 km || 
|-id=953 bgcolor=#d6d6d6
| 216953 ||  || — || November 14, 1999 || Socorro || LINEAR || HYG || align=right | 4.6 km || 
|-id=954 bgcolor=#fefefe
| 216954 ||  || — || December 7, 1999 || Socorro || LINEAR || — || align=right | 1.1 km || 
|-id=955 bgcolor=#fefefe
| 216955 ||  || — || December 7, 1999 || Socorro || LINEAR || — || align=right | 1.4 km || 
|-id=956 bgcolor=#d6d6d6
| 216956 ||  || — || December 7, 1999 || Socorro || LINEAR || — || align=right | 6.3 km || 
|-id=957 bgcolor=#fefefe
| 216957 ||  || — || December 13, 1999 || Kitt Peak || Spacewatch || NYS || align=right data-sort-value="0.90" | 900 m || 
|-id=958 bgcolor=#fefefe
| 216958 ||  || — || January 3, 2000 || Socorro || LINEAR || — || align=right | 1.4 km || 
|-id=959 bgcolor=#fefefe
| 216959 ||  || — || January 3, 2000 || Socorro || LINEAR || — || align=right | 1.5 km || 
|-id=960 bgcolor=#d6d6d6
| 216960 ||  || — || January 3, 2000 || Socorro || LINEAR || — || align=right | 8.4 km || 
|-id=961 bgcolor=#E9E9E9
| 216961 ||  || — || January 8, 2000 || Socorro || LINEAR || — || align=right | 4.4 km || 
|-id=962 bgcolor=#fefefe
| 216962 ||  || — || January 12, 2000 || Kitt Peak || Spacewatch || H || align=right data-sort-value="0.93" | 930 m || 
|-id=963 bgcolor=#fefefe
| 216963 ||  || — || January 30, 2000 || Kitt Peak || Spacewatch || MAS || align=right | 1.2 km || 
|-id=964 bgcolor=#fefefe
| 216964 ||  || — || February 2, 2000 || Socorro || LINEAR || V || align=right | 1.2 km || 
|-id=965 bgcolor=#E9E9E9
| 216965 ||  || — || February 29, 2000 || Socorro || LINEAR || — || align=right | 3.9 km || 
|-id=966 bgcolor=#d6d6d6
| 216966 ||  || — || March 2, 2000 || Kitt Peak || Spacewatch || — || align=right | 3.9 km || 
|-id=967 bgcolor=#E9E9E9
| 216967 ||  || — || March 10, 2000 || Socorro || LINEAR || — || align=right | 1.2 km || 
|-id=968 bgcolor=#fefefe
| 216968 ||  || — || March 5, 2000 || Socorro || LINEAR || — || align=right | 1.2 km || 
|-id=969 bgcolor=#E9E9E9
| 216969 ||  || — || March 5, 2000 || Socorro || LINEAR || — || align=right | 3.4 km || 
|-id=970 bgcolor=#E9E9E9
| 216970 ||  || — || March 27, 2000 || Anderson Mesa || LONEOS || BAR || align=right | 2.0 km || 
|-id=971 bgcolor=#E9E9E9
| 216971 ||  || — || May 5, 2000 || Socorro || LINEAR || — || align=right | 1.4 km || 
|-id=972 bgcolor=#E9E9E9
| 216972 ||  || — || May 28, 2000 || Socorro || LINEAR || — || align=right | 1.9 km || 
|-id=973 bgcolor=#E9E9E9
| 216973 ||  || — || May 27, 2000 || Socorro || LINEAR || — || align=right | 2.6 km || 
|-id=974 bgcolor=#E9E9E9
| 216974 ||  || — || May 24, 2000 || Anderson Mesa || LONEOS || — || align=right | 2.7 km || 
|-id=975 bgcolor=#E9E9E9
| 216975 ||  || — || July 7, 2000 || Socorro || LINEAR || JUN || align=right | 3.2 km || 
|-id=976 bgcolor=#E9E9E9
| 216976 ||  || — || July 5, 2000 || Anderson Mesa || LONEOS || — || align=right | 5.5 km || 
|-id=977 bgcolor=#E9E9E9
| 216977 ||  || — || July 25, 2000 || Prescott || P. G. Comba || — || align=right | 3.3 km || 
|-id=978 bgcolor=#E9E9E9
| 216978 ||  || — || July 23, 2000 || Socorro || LINEAR || — || align=right | 3.1 km || 
|-id=979 bgcolor=#fefefe
| 216979 ||  || — || August 24, 2000 || Socorro || LINEAR || — || align=right | 2.0 km || 
|-id=980 bgcolor=#fefefe
| 216980 ||  || — || August 24, 2000 || Socorro || LINEAR || V || align=right | 1.2 km || 
|-id=981 bgcolor=#E9E9E9
| 216981 ||  || — || August 24, 2000 || Socorro || LINEAR || — || align=right | 2.9 km || 
|-id=982 bgcolor=#E9E9E9
| 216982 ||  || — || August 24, 2000 || Socorro || LINEAR || EUN || align=right | 2.6 km || 
|-id=983 bgcolor=#E9E9E9
| 216983 ||  || — || August 24, 2000 || Socorro || LINEAR || — || align=right | 3.0 km || 
|-id=984 bgcolor=#E9E9E9
| 216984 ||  || — || August 25, 2000 || Socorro || LINEAR || DOR || align=right | 4.4 km || 
|-id=985 bgcolor=#FFC2E0
| 216985 ||  || — || August 31, 2000 || Socorro || LINEAR || APOPHA || align=right data-sort-value="0.21" | 210 m || 
|-id=986 bgcolor=#E9E9E9
| 216986 ||  || — || August 31, 2000 || Socorro || LINEAR || — || align=right | 3.7 km || 
|-id=987 bgcolor=#E9E9E9
| 216987 ||  || — || August 31, 2000 || Socorro || LINEAR || — || align=right | 4.2 km || 
|-id=988 bgcolor=#E9E9E9
| 216988 ||  || — || August 21, 2000 || Anderson Mesa || LONEOS || — || align=right | 3.5 km || 
|-id=989 bgcolor=#E9E9E9
| 216989 ||  || — || September 1, 2000 || Socorro || LINEAR || GEF || align=right | 2.9 km || 
|-id=990 bgcolor=#fefefe
| 216990 ||  || — || September 1, 2000 || Socorro || LINEAR || — || align=right | 1.4 km || 
|-id=991 bgcolor=#E9E9E9
| 216991 ||  || — || September 1, 2000 || Socorro || LINEAR || — || align=right | 4.1 km || 
|-id=992 bgcolor=#E9E9E9
| 216992 ||  || — || September 3, 2000 || Socorro || LINEAR || — || align=right | 5.2 km || 
|-id=993 bgcolor=#E9E9E9
| 216993 || 2000 SQ || — || September 19, 2000 || Kitt Peak || Spacewatch || — || align=right | 3.7 km || 
|-id=994 bgcolor=#E9E9E9
| 216994 ||  || — || September 23, 2000 || Socorro || LINEAR || HOF || align=right | 4.1 km || 
|-id=995 bgcolor=#E9E9E9
| 216995 ||  || — || September 23, 2000 || Socorro || LINEAR || — || align=right | 4.2 km || 
|-id=996 bgcolor=#E9E9E9
| 216996 ||  || — || September 23, 2000 || Socorro || LINEAR || — || align=right | 3.5 km || 
|-id=997 bgcolor=#E9E9E9
| 216997 ||  || — || September 23, 2000 || Socorro || LINEAR || — || align=right | 2.9 km || 
|-id=998 bgcolor=#E9E9E9
| 216998 ||  || — || September 24, 2000 || Socorro || LINEAR || — || align=right | 4.0 km || 
|-id=999 bgcolor=#E9E9E9
| 216999 ||  || — || September 24, 2000 || Socorro || LINEAR || — || align=right | 3.0 km || 
|-id=000 bgcolor=#E9E9E9
| 217000 ||  || — || September 23, 2000 || Socorro || LINEAR || — || align=right | 3.5 km || 
|}

References

External links 
 Discovery Circumstances: Numbered Minor Planets (215001)–(220000) (IAU Minor Planet Center)

0216